= Politics of Hamburg =

The bases of the political system are the Basic Law for the Federal Republic of Germany and the Constitution of the Free and Hanseatic city of Hamburg.

The Free and Hanseatic city of Hamburg is its own state in the Federal Republic of Germany. Hamburg is a republic, democratic welfare state and a constitutional state. At the same time Hamburg is a municipality, there is no separation between these two administrative tasks. The power to create a law is restricted by federal law.

There is a clear separation of powers.

The two main parties in the current government of Hamburg are the centre-left Social Democratic Party of Germany (SPD) and the left-wing Alliance 90/The Greens (Green). Historically, the Christian Democratic Union of Germany has also had a significant presence.

== List of mayors of Hamburg ==
Political party key: SPD CDU

First Mayor and President of the Senate of Hamburg
Portrait		Name (Born–Died)	Term of office			Political party
Portrait		Name (Born–Died)	Took office	Left office	Days	Political party
Hamburg (1945–1949)
British occupation zone in Allied-occupied Germany
–		Rudolf Petersen (1878–1962); Appointed by the British military	15 May 1945	22 November 1946	556	Christian Democratic Union
1	Max Brauer 1927	Max Brauer; First term (1887–1973)	22 November 1946	23 May 1949	913	Social Democratic Party
Hamburg (1949–present)
City-state of the Federal Republic of Germany
(1)	Max Brauer 1927	Max Brauer; First term (1887–1973)	23 May 1949	2 December 1953	1654	Social Democratic Party
2		Kurt Sieveking (1897–1986)	2 December 1953	4 December 1957	1463	Christian Democratic Union
2 (1)	Max Brauer 1927	Max Brauer; Second term (1887–1973)	4 December 1957	31 December 1960 (resigned)	1123	Social Democratic Party
4		Paul Nevermann (1902–1979)	1 January 1961	9 June 1965 (resigned)	1620	Social Democratic Party
5		Herbert Weichmann (1896–1983)	9 June 1965	9 June 1971 (resigned)	2191	Social Democratic Party
6		Peter Schulz (1930–2013)	9 June 1971	4 November 1974 (resigned)	1244	Social Democratic Party
7		Hans-Ulrich Klose (1937–2023)	12 November 1974	22 May 1981 (resigned)	2383	Social Democratic Party
8		Klaus von Dohnanyi (born 1928)	24 June 1981	8 June 1988	2541	Social Democratic Party
9	Henning Voscherau	Henning Voscherau (1941–2016)	8 June 1988	8 October 1997 (resigned)	3409	Social Democratic Party
10		Ortwin Runde (born 1944)	12 November 1997	31 October 2001	1449	Social Democratic Party
11	Ole von Beust	Ole von Beust (born 1955)	31 October 2001	25 August 2010 (resigned)	3220	Christian Democratic Union
12	Christoph Ahlhaus	Christoph Ahlhaus (born 1969)	25 August 2010	7 March 2011	194	Christian Democratic Union
13	Olaf Scholz	Olaf Scholz (born 1958)	7 March 2011	13 March 2018 (resigned)	2563	Social Democratic Party
14	Peter Tschentscher	Peter Tschentscher (born 1966)	28 March 2018	Incumbent	2744	Social Democratic Party

== Hamburg Parliament ==
=== Party strength in the Landtag ===
A darkened box under a party in any given year denotes that the party had either not yet been founded, or the party had become defunct, by the date of that election.

Election year	Total seats	Seats won						
Election year	Total seats	SPD	CDU	FDP	Grüne	Linke	AfD	Other
1946	110	83	16	7				4 (Note: KPD)
1949	120	65	40 (Note: VBH alliance of CDU, FDP, DKP)					15 (Note: 9 DP, 5 KPD, 1 Radical Social Freedom)
1953	120	58	62 (Note: Hamburg Block alliance of CDU, FDP, DP, BHE)					
1957	120	69	41	10				
1961	120	72	36	12				
1966	120	74	38	8				
1970	120	70	41	9				
1974	120	56	51	13				
1978	120	69	51					
June 1982	120	55	56		9			
December 1982	120	64	48		8			
1986	120	53	54		13			
1987	120	55	49	8	8			
1991	121	61	44	7	9			
1993	121	58	36		19			8 (Note: Statt Party)
1997	121	54	46		21			
2001	121	46	33	6	11			25 (Note: Party for a Rule of Law Offensive)
2004	121	41	63		17			
2008	121	45	56		12	8		
2011	121	62	28	9	14	8		
2015	121	58	20	9	15	11	8	
2020	123	54	15	1	33	13	7	

=== Legislative compositions ===
1st Parliament, following 1946 election

2nd Parliament, following 1949 election

3rd Parliament, following 1953 election

4th Parliament, following 1957 election

5th Parliament, following 1961 election

6th Parliament, following 1966 election

7th Parliament, following 1970 election

8th Parliament, following 1974 election

9th Parliament, following 1978 election

10th Parliament, following June 1982 election

11th Parliament, following December 1982 election

12th Parliament, following 1986 election

13th Parliament, following 1987 election

14th Parliament, following 1991 election

15th Parliament, following 1993 election

16th Parliament, following 1997 election

17th Parliament, following 2001 election

18th Parliament, following 2004 election

19th Parliament, following 2008 election

20th Parliament, following 2011 election

21st Parliament, following 2015 election

22nd Parliament, following 2020 election

=== City election results maps ===
2015 Hamburg state election

2020 Hamburg state election

=== Constituencies in the Landtag ===
- Hamburg-Mitte (01)
- Billstedt – Wilhelmsburg – Finkenwerder (02)
- Altona (03)
- Blankenese (04)
- Rotherbaum – Harvestehude – Eimsbüttel-Ost (05)
- Stellingen – Eimsbüttel-West (06)
- Lokstedt – Niendorf – Schnelsen (07)
- Eppendorf – Winterhude (08)
- Barmbek – Uhlenhorst – Dulsberg (09)
- Fuhlsbüttel – Alsterdorf – Langenhorn (10)
- Wandsbek (11)
- Bramfeld – Farmsen-Berne (12)
- Alstertal - Walddörfer (13)
- Rahlstedt (14)
- Bergedorf (15)
- Harburg (16)
- Süderelbe (17)

== Constituencies in the Bundestag ==
No	Constituency	Member	2021	Voters	2017	2013	2009	2005	2002	1998	1994	1990
18	Hamburg-Mitte	Falko Droßmann	SPD	242,078	SPD	SPD	SPD	SPD	SPD	SPD	SPD	SPD
19	Hamburg-Altona	Linda Heitmann	Grüne	187,705	SPD	SPD	SPD	SPD	SPD	SPD	SPD	SPD
20	Hamburg-Eimsbüttel	Till Steffen	Grüne	193,823	SPD	SPD	CDU	SPD	SPD	SPD	SPD	SPD
21	Hamburg-Nord	Dorothee Martin	SPD	219,909	CDU	CDU	CDU	SPD	SPD	SPD	CDU	CDU
22	Hamburg- Wandsbek	Aydan Özoğuz	SPD	233,483	SPD	SPD	CDU	SPD	SPD	SPD	SPD	SPD
23	Hamburg-Bergedorf – Harburg	Metin Hakverdi	SPD	221,794	SPD	SPD	SPD	SPD	SPD	Created for 2002 election		

== See also ==
- Hamburg Parliament
- Government of Hamburg
- 2020 Hamburg state election
