= Hoheluft =

Hoheluft-Ost/Hoheluft-West
- Quarter of Hamburg
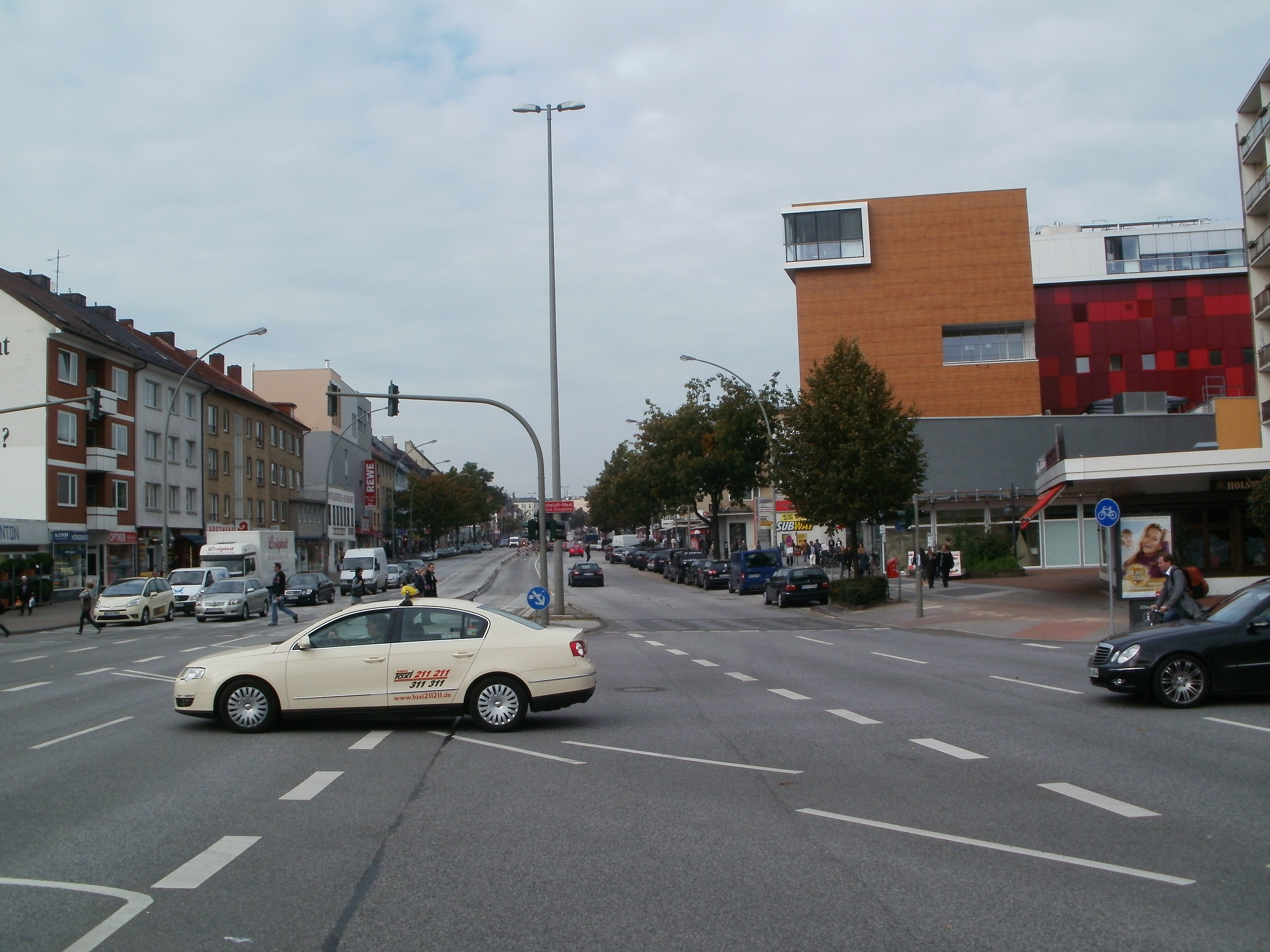
- Hoheluftchaussee, the boundary between Hoheluft-Ost and Hoheluft-West

- Location of Hoheluft in Hamburg
- Interactive map of Hoheluft-Ost/Hoheluft-West
- Location within Germany Location within Hamburg
- Coordinates: 53°35′2″N 9°58′9″E
- Country: Germany
- State: Hamburg
- City: Hamburg
- Borough: Hamburg-Nord and Eimsbüttel

Area
  - Total: 1.3 km^{2} (0.50 sq mi)

Population (2024-12-31)
  - Total: 23,494
  - Density: 18,000/km^{2} (47,000/sq mi)
- Time zone: UTC+01:00 (CET)
  - Summer (DST): UTC+02:00 (CEST)
- Dialling codes: 040
- Vehicle registration: HH

Hoheluft (German: [hoːəˈlʊft]) is an area composed of two quarters of Hamburg, which are characterized by their largely preserved architecture.

Administratively, Hoheluft is divided into two quarters: Hoheluft-Ost in the borough of Hamburg-Nord, and Hoheluft-West in the borough of Eimsbüttel. The Hoheluftchaussee is the boundary between the two quarters.

With a population density of approximately 22,673 inhabitants per square kilometer as of 2016, Hoheluft is one of the most densely populated quarters in Germany. Like Eppendorf to its east and Eimsbüttel to its west, Hoheluft is a popular suburb among the affluent of Hamburg.

== Geography ==
The Isebekkanal is the southeast border of Hoheluft. Behind it lies the quarter of Harvestehude. Hoheluft-Ost also borders Eppendorf, Hoheluft-West also borders Lokstedt in the north and Eimsbüttel in the west. The Hoheluftchaussee in the east forms the border between Hoheluft-West and the district of Hoheluft-Ost, part of the district of Hamburg-Nord.

== History ==
Historically and administratively, the district of Hoheluft is closely connected with Eppendorf, which - like Eimsbüttel and Harvestehude - had been owned by Harvestehude Monastery. The name Hoheluft was only officially introduced as a district name in 1939.

The origin of the name is not clearly known. The local historians Wilhelm Melhop and Armin Clausen assume that the boundary point Veerendeel to the former village of Lokstedt as the elevation of the area over the lowlands of the Isebek was designated as "on the Hohenluft". But it can also be that the name is derived from a gallows erected in 1602 or the "Hoge Licht" of the local inn. This light served the purpose of guiding drivers at night and fog. The first mentions of the name Hoheluft in documents are in 1802, when it is mentioned in the church book of Eppendorf, and in 1805, where it is mentioned in logs of the Johanniskloster, which describe a plot "auf der hohe Lucht."

== Politics ==
These are the results of the Hamburg state election:

Election	Hoheluft-West						
Election	Greens	SPD	Left	CDU	FDP	AfD	Others
2020	40,0 %	31,2 %	12,2 %	5,2 %	3,5 %	2,0 %	5,9 %
2015	24,2 %	42,2 %	11,0 %	8,7 %	6,2 %	2,9 %	4,8 %
2011	19,9 %	48,2 %	7,4 %	13,1 %	5,5 %	–	5,9 %
2008	17,2 %	38,6 %	6,9 %	30,6 %	4,6 %	–	2,0 %
2004	24,1 %	33,3 %	–	34,8 %	2,7 %	–	5,1 %
2001	19,1 %	41,7 %	0,6 %	17,5 %	6,0 %	–	15,1 %
1997	25,8 %	36,4 %	1,2 %	23,0 %	3,2 %	–	10,4 %
1993	24,8 %	39,5 %	–	17,7 %	3,9 %	–	14,1 %
1991	14,4 %	51,2 %	0,9 %	25,9 %	4,5 %	–	3,1 %
1987	19,9 %	40,8 %	–	33,5 %	4,7 %	–	1,1 %
1986	13,9 %	48,9 %	–	30,4 %	5,7 %	–	1,1 %
Dec 1982	13,4 %	52,2 %	–	31,5 %	2,0 %	–	0,9 %
Jun 1982	14,4 %	43,1 %	–	35,4 %	4,9 %	–	2,2 %
1978	7,2 %	50,9 %	–	32,9 %	5,5 %	–	3,5 %
1974	–	47,3 %	–	37,9 %	10,4 %	–	4,4 %
1970	–	57,3 %	–	31,3 %	6,3 %	–	5,1 %
1966	–	57,9 %	–	30,1 %	6,9 %	–	5,1 %

Election	Hoheluft-Ost						
Election	Greens	SPD	CDU	Left	FDP	AfD	Others
2020	35,1 %	33,0 %	9,3 %	8,6 %	6,6 %	2,3 %	5,1 %
2015	18,6 %	42,7 %	13,6 %	8,4 %	10,8 %	2,1 %	3,8 %
2011	17,1 %	47,4 %	15,8 %	5,7 %	9,8 %	–	4,2 %
2008	14,6 %	34,8 %	39,4 %	4,8 %	5,3 %	–	1,0 %
2004	21,7 %	33,8 %	37,4 %	–	2,9 %	–	4,2 %
2001	21,8 %	39,5 %	17,9 %	0,4 %	5,9 %	–	14,5 %
1997	25,7 %	35,3 %	24,3 %	0,6 %	4,6 %	–	9,5 %
1993	26,8 %	39,2 %	17,8 %	–	4,5 %	–	11,7 %
1991	14,8 %	50,8 %	24,9 %	0,7 %	5,7 %	–	3,1 %
1987	14,1 %	49,7 %	28,6 %	–	6,3 %	–	1,3 %
1986	20,1 %	41,9 %	31,6 %	–	5,3 %	–	1,1 %
Dec 1982	13,5 %	52,7 %	30,2 %	–	2,6 %	–	1,0 %
Jun 1982	14,2 %	44,6 %	34,7 %	–	4,6 %	–	1,9 %
1978	8,0 %	50,6 %	30,8 %	–	6,5 %	–	4,1 %
1974	–	45,7 %	37,0 %	–	12,5 %	–	3,8 %
1970	–	55,3 %	31,8 %	–	7,4 %	–	4,5 %
1966	–	57,0 %	30,8 %	–	7,6 %	–	4,6 %
