= Alliance 90/The Greens Hamburg =

Hamburg state association of Alliance '90/The Greens

Alliance 90/The Greens Hamburg is the Hamburg state association of Alliance '90/The Greens. Until 21 April 2012, it was known as the "Green-Alternative List" (Grün-Alternative Liste). Although most green-alternative lists are not part of Alliance 90/The Greens in Germany, Hamburg was special in that its GAL had been the Hamburg state association of the party since 1984.

The Greens Hamburg were the biggest winners in the Hamburg state election of 21 February 2020, roughly doubling their vote share to 24.2%.

== Election results ==
=== Bürgerschaft of Hamburg ===
| Election | Popular Vote | | Seats | +/– | Government |
| Election | Votes | % | Seats | +/– | Government |
|---|---|---|---|---|---|
| 1982 | 73,404 | 7.7 (#3) | 9 / 120 | | Opposition |
| 1982 | 70,501 | 6.8 (#3) | 8 / 120 | ▼1 | Opposition |
| 1986 | 99,779 | 10.4(#3) | 13 / 120 | ▲5 | Opposition |
| 1987 | 69,148 | 7.0 (#3) | 8 / 120 | ▼5 | Opposition |
| 1991 | 59,262 | 7.2 (#3) | 9 / 121 | ▲1 | Opposition |
| 1993 | 114,261 | 13.5 (#3) | 19 / 121 | ▲10 | Opposition |
| 1997 | 114,387 | 13.9 (#3) | 21 / 121 | ▲2 | SPD-Greens |
| 2001 | 72,771 | 8.6 (#4) | 11 / 121 | ▼10 | Opposition |
| 2004 | 101,227 | 12.3 (#3) | 17 / 121 | ▲6 | Opposition |
| 2008 | 74,472 | 9.6 (#3) | 12 / 121 | ▼5 | CDU-Greens |
| 2011 | 384,502 | 11.2 (#3) | 14 / 121 | ▲2 | Opposition |
| 2015 | 432,713 | 12.3 (#3) | 15 / 121 | ▲1 | SPD-Greens |
| 2020 | 980,361 | 24.2 (#2) | 33 / 123 | ▲18 | SPD-Greens |
| 2025 | 805,783 | 18.5 (#3) | 25 / 123 | ▼8 | SPD–Greens |
