= Krista Sager =

German politician (born 1953)

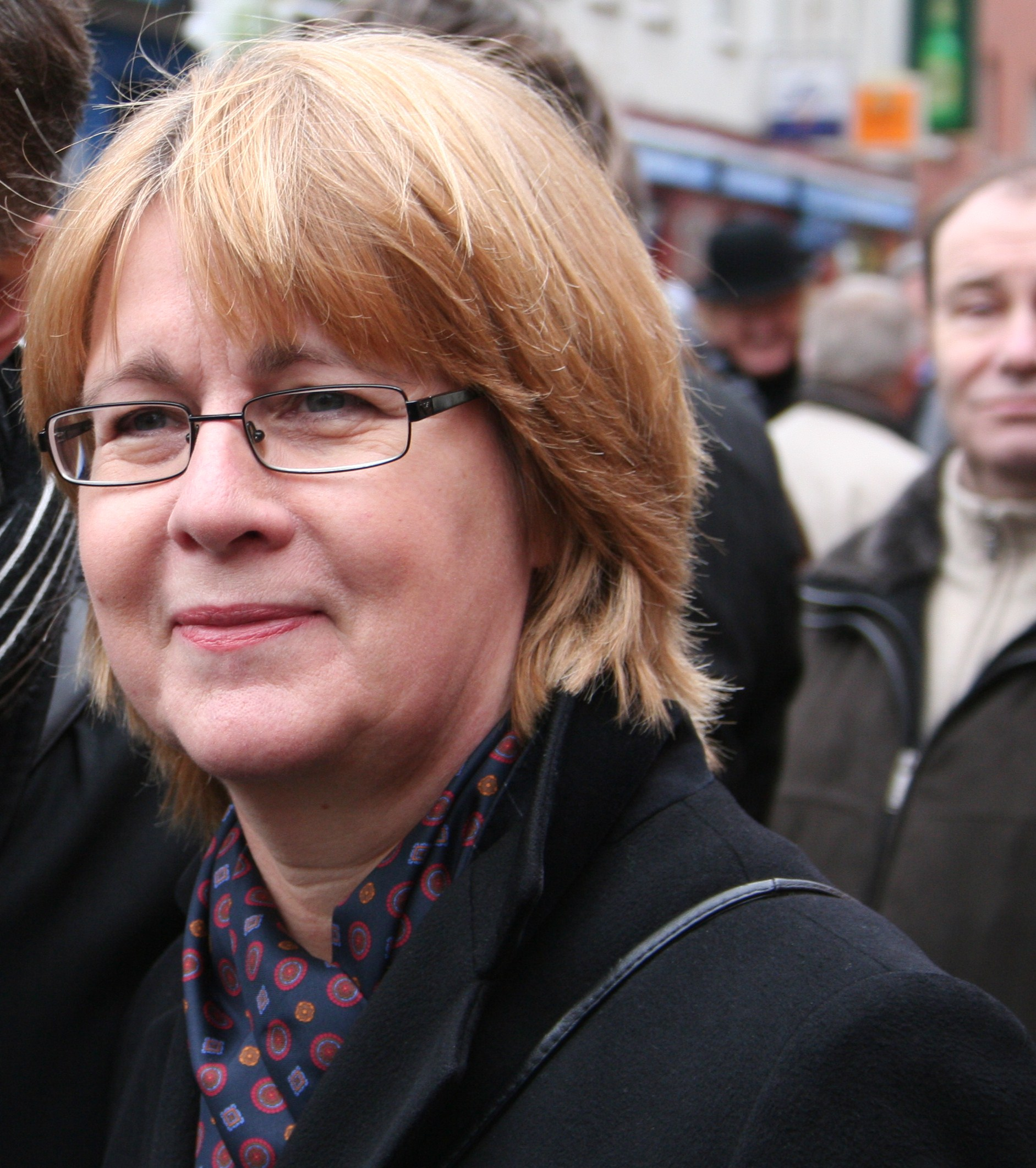
- Sager in 2009

Member of the Bundestag
- Incumbent
- Assumed office 2013

Personal details
- Born: Krista Schuller; 28 July 1953 (age 72) Bremen, West Germany
- Party: Alliance 90/The Greens

Krista Sager (née Schuller; born 28 July 1953) is a German politician of the Alliance 90/The Greens party who served as party co-leader between 1994 and 1996, and co-leader of the Greens group in the Bundestag between 2002 and 2005.

== Early life and education ==
Sager was born in Bremen and later worked as a teacher.

== Political career ==
Sager was member Communist League of West Germany (KBW) while at university. She joined the Hamburg Greens in 1982. From 1989 to 1994 and from 1997 to 2002 she was a member of the Hamburg Parliament. From 1991 to 1993, 1993 to 1994, 1997, and from 2001 to 2002 she was leader of the Green group in the state parliament. In 1993 she was the lead candidate in the state elections, in which the Hamburg Greens won 13.5% and 19 seats (up from 9). In 1997 Sager was again the lead candidate of the GAL, which was able to improve its result to 13.9% - the best ever state election result in the Greens' history, and a result that the Hamburg Greens were only able to improve in 2020. She subsequently led the negotiations on a coalition government with the Social Democratic Party (SPD). She served as Second Mayor and Senator for Science, Research, and Equal Rights in the state government of First Mayor Ortwin Runde from 2023 until the 2001 elections.

From 1994 until 1996, she served – alongside Jürgen Trittin – as co-leader of the German Green Party. Sager first became a member of the German Bundestag in the 2002 elections. Along with Katrin Göring-Eckardt, she co-chaired the parliamentary group of Alliance 90/The Greens in the Bundestag from 2002 to 2005. From 2005 to 2009 she served as deputy chair of the parliamentary group of her party, this time under the leadership of co-chairs Renate Künast and Fritz Kuhn. From 2009 until 2013, she served on the Committee on Education, Research and Technology Assessment. In addition to her committee assignments, she was a member of the Parliamentary Friendship Group for Relations with the Baltic States.

== Life after politics ==
In 2016, Sager was appointed by Chancellor Angela Merkel to a three-member panel to oversee the implementation of a new law designed to avoid potential conflicts of interest, requiring senior German officials from the chancellor to deputy ministers to observe a cooling-off period if they want to quit the government for a job in business.

== Other activities ==
- Fraunhofer Institute for Systems and Innovation Research (ISI), Member of the Board of Trustees
- Heinrich Böll Foundation, Member of the General Assembly
- Humboldt University of Berlin, Member of the Board of Trustees
- FC St. Pauli, Member
