= Snap election =

Election called earlier than scheduled

A snap election is an election that is called earlier than the one that has been scheduled. Snap elections in parliamentary systems are often called to resolve a political impasse such as a hung parliament where no single political party has a majority of seats, when the incumbent prime minister is defeated in a motion of no confidence, to capitalize on an unusual electoral opportunity, or to decide a pressing issue. Snap elections are called under circumstances when an election is not required by law or convention.

A snap election differs from a recall election and by-election in that a completely new parliament is chosen as opposed to merely re-electing individual seats in an already established assembly.

Early elections can be called in certain jurisdictions after a ruling coalition is dissolved if a replacement coalition cannot be formed within a constitutionally set time limit. In some countries a referendum can result in a snap election. Public support for snap elections varies with the government approval rate.

In countries where the power to call snap elections (the dissolution of parliament) lies with the incumbent head of government (such as a prime minister), they often result in increased majorities for the party already in power provided they have been called at an advantageous time. However, snap elections can also backfire on the incumbent resulting in a decreased majority or in some cases the opposition winning or gaining power.

== Americas ==
=== Belize ===
According to Section 84 of the Constitution of Belize, the National Assembly must be dissolved "five years from the date when the two Houses of the former National Assembly first met" unless dissolved sooner by the governor-general upon the advice of the prime minister.

Since Belize gained independence from the United Kingdom in September 1981, snap elections have been called twice, in 1993 and 2012. In March 2015, Belizean Prime Minister Dean Barrow ruled out the possibility of a snap election later in the year. In the November 2015 general election, Prime Minister Barrow's United Democratic Party increased its majority by 9 percent as it made Belizean history, forming its third consecutive government.

=== Canada ===
In Canada, snap elections at the federal level are very common. Section 50 of the Constitution Act, 1867 and section 4 of the Canadian Charter of Rights and Freedoms limits the maximum life of a federal parliament to five years following the return of the last writs of election. A law was passed to set the election date on the third Monday in October in the fourth calendar year after the previous poll, although courts found it effectively legally unenforceable and not binding on the prime minister. Any election that occurs before the schedule is a snap election.

During his 10 years as prime minister, Jean Chrétien recommended to the governor general to call two snap elections, in 1997 and 2000, winning both times. Wilfrid Laurier and John Turner, meanwhile, both lost their premierships in snap elections they themselves had called (in 1911 and 1984, respectively). The most notable federal snap election is that of 1958, where Prime Minister John Diefenbaker called an election just nine months after the previous one and transformed his minority government into the largest majority in the history of Canada up to that date.

A snap election was also called in the province of Ontario in 1990, three years into Premier David Peterson's term. Peterson was polling at 54%, lower than his peak popularity but still well above the opposition party leaders, and expected to be re-elected with comfortable majority. However, the 1990 Ontario general election backfired since it was interpreted as a sign of arrogance, with some cynically viewing it as an attempt to win another mandate before an anticipated economic recession. In the biggest upset in Ontario history, the Ontario New Democratic Party led by Bob Rae won an unprecedented majority government while Peterson lost his own seat to a rookie NDP candidate. A similar result occurred in Alberta in 2015 when Premier Jim Prentice of the governing Progressive Conservative Association of Alberta called a snap election. A few months before, 11 MLAs including their leader from the official opposition Wildrose Party had crossed the floor to sit with the government. However, the province was entering an economic recession due to the abrupt 2010s oil glut, and Prentice's budget was not well received by either the political left or right. The resulting Alberta New Democratic Party majority victory unseated 13 cabinet ministers and ended 44 years of Progressive Conservative government in Alberta.

In 2021, sitting Liberal Prime Minister Justin Trudeau called a snap election in an attempt to win a majority, up from his previous minority government. He justified the snap election as a way for Canadians to choose which government leads them through Canada's recovery from the COVID-19 pandemic. However, Trudeau was widely criticized for calling the snap election while the country was in the midst of a 4th wave of Covid. Following the election Trudeau managed to remain Prime Minister, but the Liberal Party failed to win a majority government.

In 2025, new Liberal Prime Minister Mark Carney called a snap election for 28 April 2025, nine days after replacing Justin Trudeau as leader of the Liberal Party and Prime Minister of Canada. Following the election Carney managed to remain Prime Minister, but the Liberal Party failed to win a majority government. However, the elections saw a reversal of polling trends from mid-2023 to January 2025, which projected the Conservative party to win the election in a landslide. This was seen as "one of the widest on record in any democracy".

=== Peru ===
The Constitution of Peru allows for the dissolution of Congress by the President if a vote of no-confidence is passed two times by the legislative body, who then has four months to call for new parliamentary elections or faces impeachment. The 2020 Peruvian parliamentary elections were declared after President Martín Vizcarra dissolved Congress.

== Asia and Oceania ==
=== Australia ===
There are three procedures in which federal elections can be held early in Australia:

- The maximum term of the Australian House of Representatives is 3 years. However, the chamber can wait several months after the election to make its first sitting, while a campaign period of at least 33 days is needed between the dates that the election is called and held. It is the norm for the chamber to be dissolved early by the Governor-General before its term expires, which is done on the advice of the Prime Minister.
- Half of the Australian Senate (excluding the seats representing territories) changes over every three years in July. An election for the half about to change over must take place up to a year before this is due, on a date determined by the government. By convention, the elections of both chambers have usually been held on the same day. If the previous Senate election was held close to the changeover, the next Senate election can be held significantly earlier.
- A double dissolution may be called to resolve conflict between the two chambers, in which case the entire membership of both chambers comes up for election. This requires at least one bill that originated in the House of Representatives (often called a "trigger") to be rejected twice by the Senate under certain conditions. In this case, the next Senate changeover is due in the second month of July after the election, while the House of Representatives begins a new 3-year term.

Examples of early elections in Australia:

- 1963 election: Liberal Prime Minister Robert Menzies called an early election for the House of Representatives because the government were struggling to govern with their narrow 2-seat majority in the chamber. The government succeeded in gaining 10 seats. The election left the House and Senate elections out of synchronization until 1974.
- 1974 election: The double dissolution election focused on Labor Prime Minister Gough Whitlam's first 1 1/2 years in office and whether the Australian public was willing to continue with his reform agenda, and also to break a deadlock in the Senate after Opposition Leader Billy Snedden announced that the opposition would block the Government's supply bills in the Senate following the Gair Affair. The Whitlam government was subsequently returned with a reduced majority in the House of Representatives but increased presence (but no majority) in the Senate, allowing the government to pass six reform bills in a joint sitting of the two houses of the Australian parliament.
- 1975 election: The election followed the controversial dismissal of the Whitlam government by Governor-General Sir John Kerr in the 1975 constitutional crisis and the installation of Opposition Leader Malcolm Fraser as prime minister. Labor believed it had a chance of winning the elections, and that the dismissal would be an electoral asset for them but the Coalition attacked Labor for the economic conditions they presided over, resulting in the Coalition winning a record victory, with 91 seats in the House of Representatives to the ALP's 36 and a 35–27 majority in the expanded Senate.
- 1983 election: While an election was not due for seven more months, Malcolm Fraser had been emboldened by the unexpected victory in a 1982 by election which his Liberal Party was expected to lose. Fraser also sought to exploit divisions in the opposition Labor Party, and was surprised to learn that the popular Bob Hawke had won the Labor Party leadership on the day he sought a dissolution. Ultimately, Labor won power and defeated the Fraser government on a 24-seat swing—the largest defeat of a sitting government since 1949, and the worst defeat a sitting non-Labor government has ever suffered.
- 1984 election: This election was held 18 months ahead of time in order to bring the elections for the House of Representatives and Senate back into line. They had been thrown out of balance by the double dissolution of 1983. It was widely expected that the incumbent Hawke Labor government would be easily re-elected, but an exceptionally long 10-week campaign, confusion over the ballot papers and a strong campaign performance by Liberal leader, Andrew Peacock, saw the government's majority reduced (although this was disguised by the increase in the size of the House from 125 to 148).
- 1998 election: The election on 3 October 1998 was held six months earlier than required by the Constitution. Prime Minister John Howard made the announcement following the launch of the coalition's Goods and Services Tax (GST) policy launch and a five-week advertising campaign. The ensuing election was almost entirely dominated by the proposed 10% GST and proposed income tax cuts.
- 2010 election: A federal election was held on Saturday, 21 August 2010, which was called relatively early in order to give Prime Minister Julia Gillard – who had won the prime ministership outside of an election from Kevin Rudd – a greater mandate. The election ended in a hung parliament, and a resultant retaining of Labor's majority in the House of Representatives after negotiations with independents and the Greens.
- 2021 Tasmanian state election: Liberal Premier Peter Gutwein called the election a year early after the Liberal majority government fell into a minority government. The Liberals won the 2021 state election with a majority of one seat, with Labor forming opposition and the crossbench being composed of Greens and independents.
- 2024 Tasmanian state election: Liberal Premier Jeremy Rockliff called the election a year early for the same reason as Gutwein (his predecessor).
- 2025 Tasmanian state election: Rockliff called another early election just over a year after the previous one after a motion of no confidence passed.

In the states and territories, all except Tasmania have fixed election dates legislated into their constitutions or electoral laws and snap elections can only be called in extraordinary circumstances when certain conditions are met (loss of confidence, loss of supply or, in the bicameral legislatures, a deadlocked bill). In Western Australia, the Premier retains the ability to call a snap election at any time despite the fixed election dates. In the Australian Capital Territory, the federal government also has the ability to call a snap election in instances of incapacitation or gross misconduct of the Legislative Assembly. As federal territories constituted under federal legislation, the federal parliament also has the ultimate power to call a snap election in the ACT and the Northern Territory through the normal legislative process, although this has never occurred.

=== Bangladesh ===
- After fraudulent elections in 1986, military dictator H.M Ershad dissolved the Third Jatiya Sangsad (legislature) and organised another snap election in 1988 to authenticate its military rule. That election was boycotted by every major political party. Through puppet coalitions and low voter turnout, Ershad gained two third of seats. The Ershad government fell in 1990, which ended 8 years of military dictatorship.
- After Khaleda Zia's Bangladesh Nationalist Party five-year term ended in January 1996, the country went to the polls on 15 February 1996, where elections were boycotted by all major opposition parties including BNP'S arch-rival Sheikh Hasina's Awami League. The opposition had demanded a neutral caretaker government to oversee the polls, but it was rejected by the incumbent government and the election went on as scheduled. The BNP won by default, grabbing all the 300 seats in the Jatiya Sangsad and assumed power. The Awami League and its allies did not accept the results and called a month-long general strike and blockades to overthrow the BNP government. The general strike was marred by bloody violence including a grenade attack on Awami League's headquarters which killed scores of people. On the other hand, the Supreme Court of Bangladesh annulled the election results which forced the BNP government to amend the constitution in a special parliamentary session by introducing the Caretaker government system as a part of the electoral reform. Eventually the BNP government was toppled and ousted when they resigned on 31 March 1996, and handed over power to the caretaker government. The caretaker government stayed in power for 90 days before new elections could be held. Finally, a snap election was held on 12 June 1996, where Awami-League won a simple majority by beating its bitter rival BNP and stayed in power for the next five years.
- Since the end of Sheikh Hasina's rule mass protests due to mass protests in the summer of 2024, a snap election occurred on 12 February 2026 after initial promises by the Yunus caretaker government to hold elections in April.

=== India ===
- 1998 general election: General elections were held in India in 1998, after the government elected in 1996 collapsed and the 12th Lok Sabha was convened. New elections were called when Indian National Congress (INC) left the United Front government led by I.K. Gujral, after they refused to drop the regional Dravida Munnetra Kazhagam (DMK) party from the government after the DMK was linked by an investigative panel to Sri Lankan separatists blamed for the assassination of Rajiv Gandhi. The outcome of the new elections was also indecisive, with no party or alliance able to create a strong majority. Although the Bharatiya Janata Party's Atal Bihari Vajpayee regained his position of prime minister getting support from 272 members out of 543, the government collapsed again in late 1998 when the J. Jayalalithaa's All India Anna Dravida Munnetra Kazhagam, with its 18 seats, withdrew their support, leading to new elections in 1999.
- 1999 general election: General elections were held in India from 5 September to 3 October 1999, a few months after the Kargil War. The 13th Lok Sabha election is of historical importance as it was the first time a united front of parties managed to attain a majority and form a government that lasted a full term of five years, thus ending a period of political instability at the national level that had been characterised by three general elections held in as many years.

On 17 April 1999, the Bharatiya Janata Party (BJP) coalition government led by Prime Minister Atal Bihari Vajpayee failed a to win a confidence vote in the Lok Sabha (India's lower house), falling short a single vote due to the withdrawal of one of the government's coalition partners – the All India Anna Dravida Munnetra Kazhagam (AIADMK). The leader of the AIADMK, J. Jayalalithaa, had consistently threatened to withdraw support from the ruling coalition if certain demands were not met, in particular the sacking of the Tamil Nadu government, control of which she had lost three years prior. The BJP accused Jayalalithaa of making the demands in order to avoid standing trial for a series of corruption charges, and no agreement between the parties could be reached leading to the government's defeat.

Sonia Gandhi, as leader of the opposition and largest opposition party (Indian National Congress) was unable to form a coalition of parties large enough to secure a working majority in the Lok Sabha. Thus shortly after the no confidence motion, President K. R. Narayanan dissolved the Parliament and called fresh elections. Atal Bihari Vajpayee remained caretaker prime minister till the elections were held later that year.

=== Israel ===
After the legislative election in April 2019 resulted in a political stalemate after Yisrael Beiteinu refused to join a Likud-led governing coalition, on the day transitional prime minister Benjamin Netanyahu's mandate for coalition formation ended, the Knesset voted to dissolve itself (preventing president Reuven Rivlin from transferring the mandate for coalition formation to the second-largest party Blue and White's leader, Benny Gantz, with respect to the process defined by the law). Thus, a snap legislative election was called, which resulted in a similar stalemate. After both Likud and Blue and White failed to form a coalition, a third consecutive snap election resulted in yet another stalemate. Progress has been made due to the COVID-19 pandemic, and consequently the thirty-fifth government of Israel was formed. However, another snap election was held in 2021 after collapse of the coalition government.

=== Japan ===
In Japan, a snap election is called when a prime minister dissolves the lower house of the National Diet. The act is based on Article 7 of the Constitution of Japan, which can be interpreted as saying that the prime minister has the power to dissolve the lower house after so advising the Emperor. Almost all general elections of the lower house have been snap elections since 1947, when the current constitution was enacted. The only exception was 1976 election, when the Prime Minister Takeo Miki was isolated within his own Liberal Democratic Party. The majority of LDP politicians opposed Miki's decision not to dissolve the lower house until the end of its 4-year term.

=== Kazakhstan ===
Nationally, elections for president and parliament in Kazakhstan are held every seven and five years, respectively. According to the Constitutional Law, the President may call a snap election for both. Snap elections must be held no later than two months after they are called.

Virtually every presidential election in Kazakhstan since independence has been held ahead of schedule in 1999, 2005, 2011, 2015, 2019, and 2022. The consecutive snap elections were due to economic and political factors with allegations for the Kazakh leadership to systemically maintain its grip on power while leaving the opposition consolidated and unprepared.

- 2019 presidential election: Long-time president Nursultan Nazarbayev unexpectedly resigned from office on 19 March 2019, leading Senate Chairman Kassym-Jomart Tokayev to briefly serve as the acting president until the scheduled 2020 election. From there Tokayev was widely viewed to temporarily serve the remainder of Nazarbayev's presidential term as a way to ensure transition of power and hand over the office to Dariga Nazarbayeva, the eldest daughter of Nazarbayev. However, On 9 April 2019, Tokayev initiated a snap presidential election for 9 June 2019 citing the reason of avoiding "political uncertainty" and became Nazarbayev's endorsed frontrunner in the race, resulting in him being officially elected to succeed Nazarbayev.

Snap parliamentary elections have also become more frequent in Kazakhstan's politics. Originally the 1994 legislative election was held as a result of the dissolution of the Supreme Soviet which previously consisted of former Communist legislators and paved the way for a multi-party system. However, due to the new Supreme Council opposing then-President Nursultan Nazarbayev, it was dissolved a year later. This was followed by the 1995 legislative elections which saw pro-Nazarbayev candidates being elected as deputies. Snap elections took place in 2007, 2012, and 2016 under the pretext of economic issues.

- 2023 legislative election: After President Kassym-Jomart Tokayev's reelection win in November 2022, he called snap elections for the lower chamber Mäjilis for 19 March 2023 under a promise to conclude "a reset and renewal of all major political institutions" following the January Events and 2022 constitutional referendum by promising for a new parliamentary composition to represent the interests of "broad groups of citizens." The election saw reduced vote share for the ruling Amanat party, resulting in an appearance of various newly formed political factions including independents for the first time since 2004.

=== New Zealand ===
New Zealand elections must be held every three years, and the date is determined by the prime minister. There have been three snap elections, in 1951, 1984 and 2002.

- The 1951 snap election occurred immediately after the 1951 waterfront dispute, in which the National Party government sided with shipping companies against a militant union, while the Labour opposition equivocated and thus annoyed both sides. The government was returned with an increased majority.
- The 1984 snap election occurred during a term in which the National Party government had a majority of only one seat. Prime Minister Robert Muldoon lost patience with his less obedient MPs and called an election, announcing it on television while visibly drunk. Muldoon's government subsequently lost and the Labour Party took power.
- The 2002 election. On 12 June 2002 the Labour Party Prime Minister Helen Clark announced that the country would have a general election on 27 July 2002. Clark claimed that an early poll was necessary due to the collapse of her junior coalition partner, the Alliance, but denied it was a snap election. This early election caused considerable comment. Critics claimed that Clark could have continued to govern, and that the early election was called to take advantage of Labour's strong position in the polls. The National Party was caught unprepared by the election and suffered its worst ever result (20.9% of the party vote), and the government was returned with an increased majority.

=== Pakistan ===
- 1990 general election: The Pakistan Peoples Party (PPP) led by Benazir Bhutto won a plurality of seats in the 1988 election and Bhutto became prime minister. However, by 1990 there was discontent over rising lawlessness, allegations of corruption and the failure of the government to fulfill the promises it had made during the 1988 campaign.
- 1993 general election: The Pakistan Muslim League (N) (PML-N) won the 1990 election and the party's leader, Nawaz Sharif, became prime minister. In early 1993 he attempted to strip the president of the power to dismiss the prime minister, National Assembly and regional assemblies. However, in April 1993 President Khan dismissed Sharif for corruption and called elections for 14 July after dissolving the National Assembly. Sharif immediately appealed to the Supreme Court, which in May ruled by 10 to 1 that Khan had exceeded his powers and therefore restored Sharif as prime minister.

Khan and Sharif then began to battle for control of Pakistan for the next two months. They both attempted to secure control over the regional assemblies and in particular, Punjab. In Punjab this saw a staged kidnapping and the moving of 130 members of the Punjab Assembly to the capital to ensure they stayed loyal to Sharif. Meanwhile, the leader of the main opposition party Benazir Bhutto threatened to lead a march on Islamabad unless new elections were called.

Finally on 18 July, under pressure from the army to resolve the power struggle, Sharif and Khan resigned as prime minister and president respectively. Elections for the National Assembly were called for 6 October with elections for the regional assemblies set to follow shortly afterwards.

- 1997 general election: The PPP won the largest number of seats in the 1993 election and Benazir Bhutto became prime minister at the head of a coalition government. However, on 5 November 1996, President Leghari, a former ally of Bhutto, dismissed the government 2 years early for alleged corruption and abuse of power. The allegations included financial mismanagement, failing to stop police killings, destroying judicial independence and violating the constitution. A number of PPP party members were detained including Bhutto's husband Asif Ali Zardari who was accused of taking commissions for arranging official deals.

A former speaker and member of the PPP Miraj Khalid was appointed interim prime minister. The National Assembly and provincial assemblies were dissolved and elections called for 3 February 1997. Bhutto denied all the charges against herself and petitioned the Supreme Court to reverse her dismissal. However, the court ruled in January that there was sufficient evidence for the dismissal to be justified legally.

=== Philippines ===
The Philippines has used the presidential system with fixed terms imposed for more of its history than not. This means that Congress cannot be dissolved, and that "snap elections" as understood under the parliamentary system cannot be invoked. However, during the presidency of Ferdinand Marcos, the constitution starting from 1973, and first applied in 1978, placed the country under the semi-presidential system of government, where the Batasang Pambansa (parliament) can be dissolved. During the operation of that constitution, the parliament was not dissolved, but Marcos, who had earlier been elected in 1981 for a six-year term, asked Parliament to move the 1987 presidential election to 1986, in response to growing social unrest, political and economic crises, political instability, and deteriorating peace and public order.

In the Philippines, the term "snap election" often refers to the 1986 presidential election. Marcos declared himself the official winner of the election but was eventually ousted when allegations of fraud marred the election. A new constitution approved in 1987 reverted to the presidential system, which made future snap elections unlikely. Fixed presidential elections are held every six years, with legislative elections held every three years, although an unused constitutional provision exists in the contingency if both the presidency and vice presidency become vacant at the same time, with a special election for both positions to be held, provided it is not within eighteen months before the date of the next presidential election.

On October 5, 2025, senator Alan Peter Cayetano urged resignation of all government officials and planning a snap election amid flood-control controversies, despite being unconstitutional.

=== Singapore ===
Under Article 65(4) of the Constitution of Singapore, the Parliament of Singapore does not invoke a fixed-term election; the duration of each Parliament term is five years from the date of its first sitting and is automatically dissolved by operation of law. The Prime Minister has broad discretion to dissolve parliament early via a vote of confidence from a majority of sitting Members of Parliament (MPs) and under the advice from the President. An election must be held within three months thereafter.

While most of the general elections were held within a gap between four or five calendar years, below here are some notable cases of calling a snap election, resulting in gains in either side of the government or oppositions:

- September 1963: After the incumbent People's Action Party-government lost its majority of seats following the events of two 1961 by-elections and the expulsions of 13 other PAP legislators on a motion of no confidence (who then formed the Barisan Sosialis party), coupled with the full autonomy of Singapore in 1963, then Prime Minister Lee Kuan Yew chose to call for an election a year earlier than the intended July 1964 date. The PAP retained its supermajority despite a plurality of popular vote; however, the party lost six seats compared to the 43 seats they won in the last election.
- August 1991: After Lee handed over his premiership to Goh Chok Tong on 28 November 1990, he called a snap election nine months later to seek a fresh mandate, resulting in that term having its shortest term in history, lasting around three years. The PAP scored only 61% of the votes, then the poorest score since post-independence until 2011, while the opposition parties gained three seats up from one to four seats in that election, including Singapore Democratic Party's chief Chiam See Tong winning the highest vote share of nearly 70% in his Potong Pasir seat and the Workers' Party's Hougang, who would go on to become their longest-serving opposition safe seat since then.
- November 2001: A snap election was called months before the intended February 2002 date due to the slow ongoing economic trends (such as the dot-com bubble and the early 2000s recession), including the aftermath of the September 11 attacks occurring two months prior. Nearly a supermajority of seats were elected via walkover, and the PAP won with around 75% of the votes despite losing two seats to the opposition.
- September 2015: Lee Hsien Loong called a snap election a year earlier than the intended October 2016 date citing the fiftieth anniversary since the country's gained independence and the death of his father Lee Kuan Yew, occurring nearly sixth months earlier. The PAP's clear mandate was proven effective when they won nearly 70% of the overall votes despite losing six seats to the oppositions; furthermore, the election also marked the first time since 1963 where all of the 89 seats were contested without walkovers.

=== Sri Lanka ===
As the Dominion of Ceylon, the House of Representatives, the lower house of the Parliament of Ceylon, was elected to a 5-year term, while the Senate of Ceylon, the upper house, could not be dissolved. The Prime Minister would request the Governor-General to dissolve the House of Representatives and call a for general election at a required time.

- 1956 general election: Though elections were not due until 1957, prime minister John Kotelawala called an early election. For the first time in Ceylon's independence, the ruling United National Party (UNP) led by Kotelawala lost power to the Sri Lanka Freedom Party (SLFP) led by S. W. R. D. Bandaranaike, who became the new prime minister.
- 1960 March general election: Though elections were not due until 1961, prime minister Wijeyananda Dahanayake dissolved parliament and called an early election as the ruling Mahajana Eksath Peramuna (MEP) coalition was collapsing. The opposition United National Party led by Dudley Senanayake obtained a plurality of seats, but without a majority could not form a stable government. This resulted in a hung parliament which would eventually lead to another snap election.
- 1960 July general election: As the general election in March resulted in a hung parliament, parliament was dissolved again and another snap election was held on 20 July 1960, where the Sri Lanka Freedom Party led by Sirimavo Bandaranaike was able to form a government.

As the Senate of Ceylon was abolished in 1971, the Constitution of 1978 introduced the Executive Presidency and increased the term length of the now unicameral parliament to 6 years. The President had the authority to dissolve parliament and call a snap election at a required time.

- 1994 general election: Though elections were not due until 1995, president Dingiri Banda Wijetunga dissolved parliament and called an early election. The opposition People's Alliance (PA) led by Chandrika Kumaratunga won a plurality of seats and ended 17 years of UNP rule in Sri Lanka.
- 2001 general election: Following the 2000 general election, the ruling People's Alliance (PA) lost its majority. Failure to form a government resulted in a deadlock for the PA. As several PA MPs began to cross over to the opposition and the government was now faced with the threat of a no-confidence motion, president Kumaratunga dissolved parliament and called for an early election. The opposition United National Front (UNF) led by Ranil Wickremesinghe won a plurality of seats, and the result was a cohabitation government where the president and prime minister were from opposing parties.
- 2004 general election: As the cohabitation government proved to be unstable, president Kumaratunga dissolved parliament and called a general election 3½ years ahead of schedule.

The 19th Amendment reduced the maximum term length of the parliament to 5 years, and made the president unable to dissolve parliament and call a snap election until 4 years and 6 months after the parliament's first meeting. On 9 November 2018, during the 2018 constitutional crisis, president Maithripala Sirisena attempted to dissolve parliament and call an early general election, but the Supreme Court declared this move unconstitutional, effectively setting the election date back to 2020.

Under the 20th Amendment, the president can now dissolve parliament and call a snap election 2 years and 6 months after the parliament's first meeting.

- 2024 general election: Though elections were not due until 2025, newly inaugurated president Anura Kumara Dissanayake dissolved parliament and called an early general election roughly 11 months ahead of schedule.

=== South Korea ===
Although South Korea operates under a presidential system, which means the parliament cannot be dissolved, the Constitution of South Korea (as of 1987) requires that, should a president be removed from its post, that a snap presidential election be called within 60 days of the removal. The winner of the election would take the post immediately after the National Election Commission certified the votes, rather than waiting for a two-month transition period as in a non-snap election.

Under this provision, two snap presidential elections have been held in 2017, following the impeachment of Park Geun-hye and in 2025, after Yoon Suk Yeol was similarly impeached.

=== Thailand ===
- 2006 general election: In 2005, Prime Minister Thaksin Shinawatra and his Thai Rak Thai Party were re-elected for a second consecutive term in office when they won a landslide general election victory by securing 375 out of 500 seats in parliament. This result gave his party the power to amend the constitution since they won a two-thirds majority. However one year later, in 2006, Thaksin was suspected to have been indulging in corrupt business practices in his telecommunication firm 'Shincorp'. And after several protests orchestrated by the People's Alliance for Democracy pursuing for the PM's resignation, Thaksin called a snap election scheduled for 2 April 2006 where the opposition party supporters boycotted the polls, resulting in over 50% of voters chosen to not cast their ballots. Due to this political demonstration, Thaksin won the snap election and captured all the 500 seats in the house of parliament. Months later, the supreme court annulled the election results and ordered a fresh election to be held within 100 days from the date of the court's ruling. However, Thaksin was ousted in a 2006 Thai coup d'état, forcing him into exile in the Philippines and Dubai. The military stayed in power until 2007 when they stepped down and held a general election in December that year to restore democracy.
- 2014 general election: Thaksin Shinawatra's sister Yingluck Shinawatra became Thailand's first female prime minister on 3 August 2011 when she won a landslide election victory on 3 July 2011. Later, the government faced a political crisis in November 2013 when her opponents wanted the prime minister and her Pheu Thai Party government to resign after she tried to pass a controversial amnesty bill in parliament which would permit the return of her brother Thaksin as a free man. However, the bill was not passed because the government succumbed to pressure from weeks of street protests and blockades that took place in Bangkok, which intensified before the King's birthday. On 9 December 2013, Prime Minister Yingluck Shinawatra decided to dissolve parliament and called a snap general election, which was held on 2 February 2014. This announcement came a day after the resignation of all MPs from the main opposition Democrat Party led by opposition leader Abhisit Vejjajiva, which boycotted the election afterwards.

== Europe ==
=== Armenia ===
Snap parliamentary elections were held in Armenia on 9 December 2018, as none of the parties in the National Assembly were able to put forward and then elect a candidate for prime minister in the two-week period following the resignation of incumbent Prime Minister Nikol Pashinyan. They were the first elections following the 2018 revolution and the country's first-ever snap elections.

=== Belgium ===
Snap elections are possible for the Federal Parliament of Belgium, but not for the regional parliaments. The last snap election was held in 2010.

Technically, usually the federal parliament is dissolved by means of a Declaration of Revision of the Constitution (automatically triggering an election), just before the normal expiration of the legislative period.

=== Bulgaria ===
Snap elections were held in 2014 when neither the Bulgarian Socialist Party nor GERB were able to form a coalition with a tied parliament.

After the 2020–2021 Bulgarian protests there has been a political stalemate which has led to snap elections in July 2021, November 2021, 2022 (after the Petkov Government fell) and 2023, June 2024 (after the fall of the Denkov Government), and October 2024.

=== Czech Republic ===
Snap general elections were held in the Czech Republic on 25 and 26 October 2013, seven months before the constitutional expiry of the elected parliament's four year legislative term.

The government elected in May 2010 led by Prime Minister Petr Nečas was forced to resign on 17 June 2013, after a corruption and bribery scandal. A caretaker government led by Prime Minister Jiří Rusnok was then appointed by the President, but narrowly lost a vote of confidence on 7 August, leading to its resignation six days later. The Chamber of Deputies then passed a motion dissolving itself on 20 August, with a call for new elections within 60 days after presidential assent. The President gave his assent on 28 August, scheduling the elections for 25 and 26 October 2013.

=== Denmark ===
In Denmark, parliamentary elections must take place no more than four years after the last election (Danish Constitution, art. 32, sec. 1); however, the prime minister can choose to call an early election at any time, provided that any elected parliament has already been called into session at least once (art. 32, sec. 2). If a government loses its majority in the Folketing, this is not automatically a vote of no confidence, but such a vote may be called, and – if lost – the government must call a new election. Denmark has a history of coalition minority governments, and due to this system, a party normally providing parliamentary support for the sitting government while not being part of it can choose to deprive the government of a parliamentary majority regarding a specific vote, but at the same time avoid calling new elections since any vote of no confidence takes place as a separate procedure.

Notably, Denmark faced a number of very short parliaments in the 1970s and the 1980s. Prime Minister Poul Schlüter lead a series of coalition minority governments calling elections in both 1984, 1987, 1988 and 1990. Likewise, his predecessors called elections in 1971, 1973, 1975, 1977, 1979 and 1981. For more than 40 years, no Danish parliament has sat its full four-year term, although Lars Løkke II and Lars Løkke Rasmussen III Cabinet came very close in 2019, in all cases, the prime minister has called elections at an earlier date.

- 2007 general election: Prime minister Anders Fogh Rasmussen announced an election date for 24 October 2007. The election was held ahead of time in the sense that by law, the election needed to be held before 8 February 2009, four years after the previous election. Anders Fogh Rasmussen explained that the elections were called early in order to allow the parliament to work on important upcoming topics without being distracted by a future election. Referring specifically to welfare reform, he said rival parties would then try to outdo each other with expensive reforms which would damage the Danish economy.
- 2022 general election: Prime minister Mette Frederiksen announced an election date for 1 November 2022. The elections were called on 5 October following an ultimatum to the government by the Social Liberals (which had been providing external support) due to the outcome of a report on the 2020 Danish mink cull by the Mink Commission, which was critical of the government.
- 2026 general election: Prime minister Mette Frederiksen announced an election date for 24 March 2026 (seven months ahead of the four-year deadline). The elections were called on 26 February after months of favourable polls for the governing Social Democrats.

=== Finland ===
The President of Finland can call for an early election. As per the version of the 2000 constitution currently in use, the president can do this only upon proposal by the prime minister and after consultations with the parliamentary groups, while the Parliament is in session. In prior versions of the constitution, the President had the power to do this unilaterally.

=== France ===
In France, under the Fifth Republic, while the National Assembly is elected for a five-year term, the President has the authority to dissolve the National Assembly and call an early election, provided the Assembly has not been dissolved in the preceding twelve months. When the presidential term of office was shortened from seven to five years in the 2000 French constitutional referendum, presidential terms became equal in length to legislative terms. Until a snap 2024 legislative election was called, presidential and parliamentary terms were synchronized, with the National Assembly elected a few weeks after the president, reducing the risk of a cohabitation. The Senate, which is the upper house, can never be dissolved prematurely.

- 1968 legislative election: The then-president Charles de Gaulle called a snap election after May protests.
- 1988 legislative election: After the re-election of François Mitterrand in that year's presidential election, a snap parliamentary election was called to try and create a parliamentary majority for Mitterrand in order to end the cohabitation government. While his allies obtained a plurality of seats, a coalition government needed to be formed. A similar dissolution occurred in 1981 after Mitterrand's first election.
- 1997 legislative election: The then-president Jacques Chirac called an election one year before it was scheduled to take place in an effort to catch the left-wing parties off guard. Partly due to the unpopularity of the prime minister, Alain Juppé, a coalition of left-wing parties were able to form a government, resulting in the longest cohabitation period in modern French history. This also marks the only time a French president has lost an election he called on his own initiative since the start of the Fifth Republic (1958).
- 2024 legislative election: President Emmanuel Macron called a snap election in response to the European Parliament elections, when Macron's party Renaissance took heavy losses and the far-right populist National Rally got 31.5% of the vote.

=== Germany ===
In the Federal Republic of Germany, elections to the Bundestag must take place within 46–48 months (every four years) after the first sitting of the previous chamber. The Federal President may only dissolve the chamber prematurely if the government loses a confidence motion (at the request of the Chancellor), or if no majority government can be formed.

- 1972 federal election: after the 1969, the second placed Social Democratic Party and the small Free Democratic Party had formed a social-liberal coalition with a relatively narrow 20-seat majority. Due to Chancellor Willy Brandt's Ostpolitik foreign policy, especially the recognition of the Oder-Neisse line, the government then lost their majority after several MPs defected to the CDU/CSU opposition. On 27 April 1972 the opposition tried to have CDU leader Rainer Barzel elected new chancellor in a motion of no confidence, but Barzel surprisingly missed the majority in the Bundestag by two votes. A snap election was held after the 1972 Olympics in Munich. Benefitting from Brandt's personal popularity and modern interior policies, his SPD became the strongest party for the first time, with 45.8%.
- 1983 federal election: The government of Chancellor Helmut Schmidt had been ousted in October 1982 after the FDP had switched from being allied with the SPD to being allied with the CDU-CSU union. Although the majority of MPs now supported the government of the new Chancellor Helmut Kohl, he wanted an early election in order to gain an explicit mandate to govern. To do this, he deliberately lost a confidence motion by asking for his coalition MPs to abstain. There was some controversy over this fake move and the decision was challenged in the Constitutional Court, but given approval by President Carstens. Kohl's government won the election with a net loss of one seat despite FDP losses. In addition, a new party, the Greens, first entered the parliament, weakening the SPD.
- 2005 federal election: in 1998 Gerhard Schröder (SPD) had won over Kohl (CDU), but already in 2002, the major parties were deadlocked at 38.5% each, and with the Greens being the larger of the minor parties, Chancellor Gerhard Schröder could carry on with his SPD-Green coalition for some time. After a series of state election losses, culminating with North Rhine-Westphalia in 2005, caused the opposition to gain a wide majority in the Bundesrat, the second chamber, Schröder deliberately lost a confidence motion to trigger new elections. His red-green coalition government also feared that left-wing SPD MPs were threatening to block Agenda 2010 reform legislation. As with the 1983 dissolution, it was challenged and upheld in the Federal Constitutional Court. The election produced a hung parliament due to the gains made by a fifth force, The Left party of former East Germany, resulting in a grand coalition being formed between the CDU-CSU and SPD. Schröder lost his chancellorship to Angela Merkel due to his party narrowly coming second in the elections.
- 2025 German federal election: Following a government crisis, Chancellor Olaf Scholz dismissed FDP leader Christian Lindner from his government on 6 November 2024, triggering the collapse of the traffic light coalition and leaving the government without a majority. On the same day, Scholz announced he would submit a motion of confidence to hold a snap election. In the election the SPD suffered a historic defeat and the CDU/CSU won the most seats.

In most German states, the parliament is able to dissolve itself. This explains why there have been many more snap elections, actual, intended, or cancelled, in German states compared to the federal level, for example:

- Hamburg: The Bürgerschaft elections of December 1982, 1987, 1993, 2004, and 2011.
- Berlin: The Abgeordnetenhaus elections of 1950, 1981, 1990, 2001 and 2023.
- Hesse: The Landtag election of 2009.
- Schleswig-Holstein: The Landtag elections of 1988, with 2009 and 2012 being two snap elections in a row, after the grand coalition of 2005 had collapsed in mid 2009. Due to ambiguity and complications with the electoral law, the 2009 election result was the subject of a legal challenge by the Greens, The Left, and the Danish minority party SSW. In August 2010, the state Constitutional Court ruled that the electoral law was unconstitutional. The court mandated that a new electoral law be legislated within six months and that new elections be held by September 2012, two years ahead of schedule.
- Thuringia: no snap elections after gains for the far right Alternative for Germany (AfD) in the 2019 Thuringian state election caused a hung parliament and the 2020 Thuringian government crisis. Snap elections were scheduled for April 25, 2021, then postponed due to the COVID-19 pandemic to align with the 2021 German federal election on September 26, but the idea was abandoned in July 2021 to carry on with the minority government led by Minister-President Bodo Ramelow of The Left. The regular 2024 Thuringian state election resulted in another hung parliament, as the AfD became largest party for the first time in Germany and the new BSW established itself in third place after splitting off from The Left. Two of the three federal traffic light coalition parties, FDP and Greens, were eliminated from presence in the Thuringian parliament altogether, while the SPD, the party of reigning German Chancellor Scholz, came close to elimination with only 6.1%.

=== Greece ===
In 2012, Greece held snap elections in two consecutive months. The government of George Papandreou, elected in the 2009 legislative election, had resigned in November 2011. Instead of triggering an immediate snap election, the government was replaced by a national unity government which had a remit to ratify and implement decisions taken with other Eurozone countries and the International Monetary Fund (IMF) a month earlier. This government served for six months.

The May 2012 legislative election produced a deadlocked parliament and attempts to form a government were unsuccessful. The constitution directs the president to dissolve a newly elected parliament that is unable to form a government. Ten days after the election, the president announced that a second election would be held. The June 2012 legislative election resulted in the formation of a coalition government.

In 2015, after the bailout referendum, in which the proposed bailout program was rejected with a 61.31% majority, the Syriza government accepted the program, relying on votes from the opposition parties New Democracy, PASOK and The River. Since many Syriza MPs refused to support the government, new elections were called for 20 September of the same year, 8 months after the previous ones.

- May 2023 Greek legislative election
- June 2023 Greek legislative election

=== Italy ===
In Italy, national snap elections have been quite frequent in modern history, both under the Monarchy and in the current republican phase. After the foundation of the Italian Republic in 1946, the first snap election occurred in 1972 and the latest one in 2022. After significant changes in the election system (in 1992–1993), the frequency of snap elections has been slightly reduced since new regulations granted completion of two of four parliamentary terms. Nonetheless, snap elections still play a role in the political debate as tools considered by political parties and the Executive branch to promote their agenda or to seize political momentum. No recall election is codified in electoral regulations. The Italian President is not required to call for a snap election, even if the prime minister asks for it, provided that the Parliament is able to form a new working majority (President Oscar Luigi Scalfaro denied snap election to Prime Minister Silvio Berlusconi after the loss of confidence in 1994).

=== Latvia ===
The 2011 Latvian parliamentary election was a snap election following the 2011 Latvian parliamentary dissolution referendum.

=== Luxembourg ===
Early general elections were held in Luxembourg on 20 October 2013. The elections were called after Prime Minister Jean-Claude Juncker, at the time the longest serving head of government in the European Union, announced his resignation over a spy scandal involving the Service de Renseignement de l'Etat (SREL). The review found Juncker deficient in his control over the service.

After a spy scandal involving the SREL illegally wiretapping politicians, the Grand Duke and his family, and allegations of paying for favours in exchange for access to government ministers and officials leaked through the press, Prime Minister Juncker submitted his resignation to the Grand Duke on 11 July 2013, upon knowledge of the withdrawal of the Luxembourg Socialist Workers' Party from the government and thereby losing its confidence and supply in the Chamber of Deputies. Juncker urged the Grand Duke for the immediate dissolution of parliament and the calling of a snap election.

=== Romania ===
In Romania, under the 1993 constitution, according the article 89, the President of Romania can dissolve the Parliament of Romania if a government has not been formed in 60 days and two proposals for Prime Minister have been refused.

=== Russia ===
In Russia, under the 1993 constitution, according the article 109, the State Duma (lower house of the Federal Assembly) is elected for a five-year term, but the president has the authority to dissolve the State Duma and call a snap election. However, this power of the president is limited, and he can use it only in two cases: if the State Duma three times in a row refused to approve the prime minister, or twice in three months pass a motion of no confidence against the Government of Russia.

- 2016 legislative election de facto were snap, as they were held three months ahead of schedule. However, the early holding of election was not due to the dissolution of the State Duma, but to the postponement of the day of voting on the day on which the regional elections were held. The early elections were approved by the Constitutional Court.

=== Slovakia ===
A snap general election took place in Slovakia on 10 March 2012 to elect 150 members of the Národná rada. The election followed the fall of Prime Minister Iveta Radičová's Slovak Democratic and Christian Union – Democratic Party-led coalition in October 2011 over a no confidence vote her government had lost because of its support for the European Financial Stability Fund. Amidst a major corruption scandal involving local center-right politicians, former Prime Minister Robert Fico's Direction – Social Democracy won an absolute majority of seats.

=== Slovenia ===
A parliamentary election for the 90 deputies to the National Assembly of Slovenia was held on 4 December 2011. This was the first early election in Slovenia's history. 65.60% of voters cast their vote. The election was surprisingly won by the center-left Positive Slovenia party, led by Zoran Janković. However, he failed to be elected as the new prime minister in the National Assembly, and the new government was formed by a right-leaning coalition of five parties, led by Janez Janša, the president of the second-placed Slovenian Democratic Party. the National Assembly consists of 90 members, elected for a four-year term, 88 members elected by the party-list proportional representation system with D'Hondt method and 2 members elected by ethnic minorities (Italians and Hungarians) using the Borda count.

The election was previously scheduled to take place in 2012, four years after the 2008 election. However, on 20 September 2011, the government led by Borut Pahor fell after a vote of no confidence.

As stated in the Constitution, the National Assembly has to elect a new prime minister within 30 days and a candidate has to be proposed by either members of the Assembly or the President of the country within seven days after the fall of a government. If this does not happen, the president dissolves the Assembly and calls for a snap election. The leaders of most parliamentary political parties expressed opinion that they preferred an early election instead of forming a new government.

As no candidates were proposed by the deadline, the President Danilo Türk announced that he would dissolve the Assembly on 21 October and that the election would take place on 4 December. The question arose as to whether the President could dissolve the Assembly after the seven days, in the event that no candidate was proposed. However, since this situation is not covered in the constitution, the decision of the President to wait the full 30 days was welcomed by the political parties. The dissolution of the Assembly, a first in independent Slovenia, took place on October 21, a minute after midnight.

=== Spain ===
- 2011 general election: The Cortes Generales were dissolved and the general election called by King Juan Carlos I on 26 September, at the request of Prime Minister José Luis Rodríguez Zapatero, who had already announced his intention to call for a snap election on 28 July.
- 2016 general election: After no party secured a majority in the 2015 general election and with ensuing negotiations leading to political deadlock, a fresh election was called for 26 June—the first time in Spanish recent history that an election was triggered as a result of failure in the government formation process.
- 2023 general election. A general election was originally due to take place in December 2023. However, after losing majorities in many regional parliaments and local councils in the 28 May 2023 local elections, Prime minister Pedro Sánchez announced a snap election to be held on 23 July.

=== Sweden ===
The Instrument of Government (Regeringsformen) in the Constitution of Sweden allows an "extra election" ("extra val" in Swedish). The wording is used to make clear it does not change the period to the next ordinary election, and the Members of Parliament elected merely serve out what remains of the four-year parliamentary term. This has however not occurred since 1958.

Elections are called by the government. Elections are also to be held if the parliament fails four times to elect a prime minister. Elections may not otherwise be called during the first three months of the Riksdag's first session after a general election. Elections may not be called by a prime minister who has resigned or been discharged.

- 2014 Swedish government crisis: On 3 December 2014, Prime Minister Stefan Löfven announced that the government was calling for a snap election on 22 March 2015, after the parliament elected on 14 September 2014 voted against the government's proposal for the 2015 state budget. However, the final order of the snap election was never carried out as six out of the eight parliament parties reached an agreement on 27 December 2014 called Decemberöverenskommelsen (The December Agreement). The agreement was dissolved in 2015.

=== Switzerland ===
Following a total revision of the Swiss Federal Constitution, both chambers of the Federal Assembly must be newly elected. Otherwise, early elections are not intended. This being the case because the Swiss political system does not rely on stable coalitions as its government, the Federal Council, acts independently from the Assembly and bills voted on by parliament are dealt on a case-by-case basis.

=== Ukraine ===
In Ukraine a snap poll must have a voter turnout higher than 50%. A snap election was most recently held with the 2019 Ukrainian parliamentary election held after President Volodymyr Zelenskyy dissolved the Verkhovna Rada shortly after his inauguration to win a parliamentary majority for his Servant of the People party.

=== United Kingdom ===
In the United Kingdom, the term snap election is usually reserved for a parliamentary election called significantly before the expiry of a Parliament's maximum term. Historically, most general elections were technically early elections because the Prime Minister could request a dissolution of Parliament from the monarch at a politically advantageous moment. This discretion was restricted by the Fixed-term Parliaments Act 2011, which limited early elections to specific circumstances such as a successful motion of no confidence or approval by a two-thirds majority of the House of Commons. During this period, the 2017 and 2019 general elections were held early under special procedures established by Parliament. The Act was repealed by the Dissolution and Calling of Parliament Act 2022, restoring the prime minister's ability to seek an early dissolution and effectively returning the pre-2011 system.
