= Voscherau =

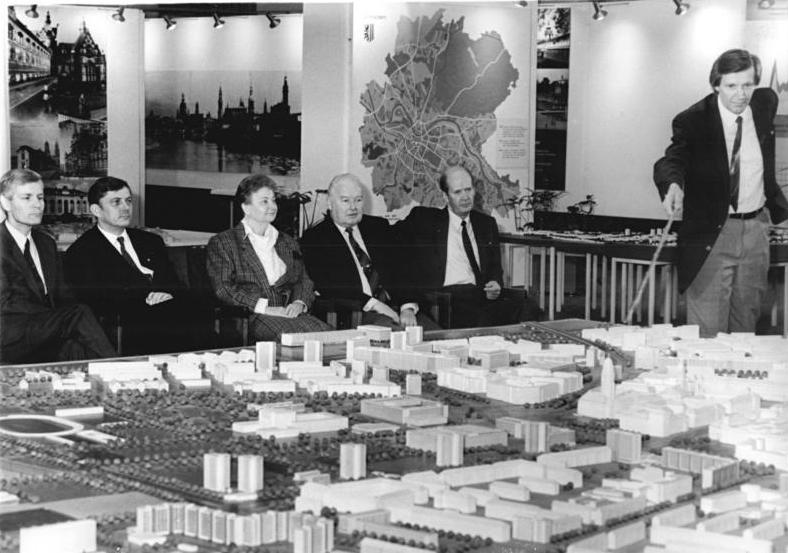
Voscherau

Voscherau is a surname. Notable persons with this name include:

- Carl Voscherau (1900–1963), German film actor
- Eggert Voscherau (1943), German businessman
- Henning Voscherau (1941–2016), German politician
- Walter Scherau (1903-1962), German actor whose stage name was Scherau
