= 1997 Hamburg state election =

State election in Hamburg, Germany

← 1993	21 September 1997	2001 →

All 121 seats in the Hamburg Parliament 61 seats needed for a majority
- Turnout: 822,511 (68.7%) ▼1.2%
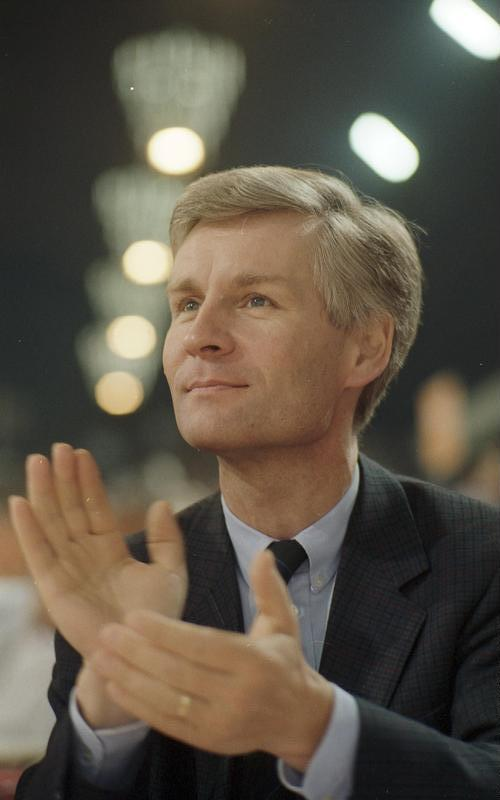
	First party	Second party	Third party
Leader	Henning Voscherau
Party	SPD	CDU	Greens
Last election	58 seats, 40.4%	36 seats, 25.1%	19 seats, 13.5%
Seats won	54	46	21
Seat change	▼4	▲10	▲2
Popular vote	297,901	252,640	114,387
Percentage	36.2%	30.7%	13.9%
Swing	▼4.2%	▲5.6%	▲0.4%
Mayor before election
Henning Voscherau
SPD
Elected Mayor
Ortwin Runde
SPD

The 1997 Hamburg state election was held on 21 September 1997 to elect the members of the 16th Hamburg Parliament. The incumbent government of the Social Democratic Party (SPD) and Statt Party under First Mayor Henning Voscherau was defeated as Statt lost all its seats. The SPD subsequently formed a coalition with the Green Alternative List (GAL). Voscherau declined to run for re-election as First Mayor due to the SPD's poor performance, and fellow SPD member Ortwin Runde succeeded him.

== Parties ==
The table below lists parties represented in the 15th Hamburg Parliament.

Name		Ideology	Leader(s)	1993 result	
Name		Ideology	Leader(s)	Votes (%)	Seats
SPD	Social Democratic Party of Germany; Sozialdemokratische Partei Deutschlands	Social democracy	Henning Voscherau	40.4%	58 / 121
CDU	Christian Democratic Union of Germany; Christlich Demokratische Union Deutschlands	Christian democracy		25.1%	36 / 121
GAL	Green Alternative List; Grün-Alternative-Liste Hamburg	Green politics		13.5%	19 / 121
STATT	STATT - Party of Independents; STATT - Partei Die Unabhängigen	Populism		5.6%	8 / 121

== Election result ==
Summary of the 21 September 1997 election results for the Hamburg Parliament
Party	Votes	%	+/-	Seats	+/-	Seats %
Social Democratic Party (SPD)	297,901	36.2	▼4.2	54	▼4	44.6
Christian Democratic Union (CDU)	252,640	30.7	▲5.6	46	▲10	38.0
Green Alternative List (GAL)	114,387	13.9	▲0.4	21	▲2	17.4
German People's Union (DVU)	40,957	4.98	▲2.2	0	±0	0
Statt Party (STATT)	31,401	3.8	▼1.8	0	▼8	0
Free Democratic Party (FDP)	28,664	3.5	▼0.7	0	±0	0
The Republicans (REP)	15,207	1.8	▼3.0	0	±0	0
League of Citizens (BfB)	10,914	1.3	▲1.3	0	±0	0
Others	30,440	3.7		0	±0	0
Total	822,511	100.0		121	±0	
Voter turnout		68.7	▼1.2			

Popular Vote
SPD	36.22%
CDU	30.72%
GAL	13.91%
DVU	4.98%
STATT	3.82%
FDP	3.48%
REP	1.85%
Other	5.03%

Bürgerschaft seats
SPD	44.63%
CDU	38.02%
GAL	17.36%

== See also ==
- Elections in Germany
- Elections in Hamburg
- Hamburg state elections in the Weimar Republic
