= 1966 Hamburg state election =

State election in West Germany

On 27 March 1966, elections for members of the sixth legislative period of the Hamburg Parliament (Hamburgische Bürgerschaft) after the Second World War were held in the German state of Hamburg. There were 1,375,491 eligible voters.

== Results ==
959,816 voters, meaning a turnout of 69.8%, gave 947,802 valid and 12,014 invalid votes.

Party	Votes	Vote percentage	Seats	Seats percentage
Social Democratic Party (SPD)	558.754	59.0%	74	61,7%
Christian Democratic Union (CDU)	284.501	30.0%	38	31,7%
Free Democratic Party (FDP)	64.837	6.8%	8	6,7%
National Democratic Party (NPD)	36.654	3.9%	0	
Frei-Soziale Union (FSU)	3.056	0.3%	0	

== Post-election ==
Herbert Weichmann continued to be the First Mayor of Hamburg.

== See also ==
- Elections in Germany
- Hamburg state elections in the Weimar Republic
- 2001 Hamburg state election
- 2004 Hamburg state election
- 2008 Hamburg state election
