= Eimsbüttel =

One of the seven boroughs (Bezirke) of Hamburg, Germany

- Borough of Hamburg
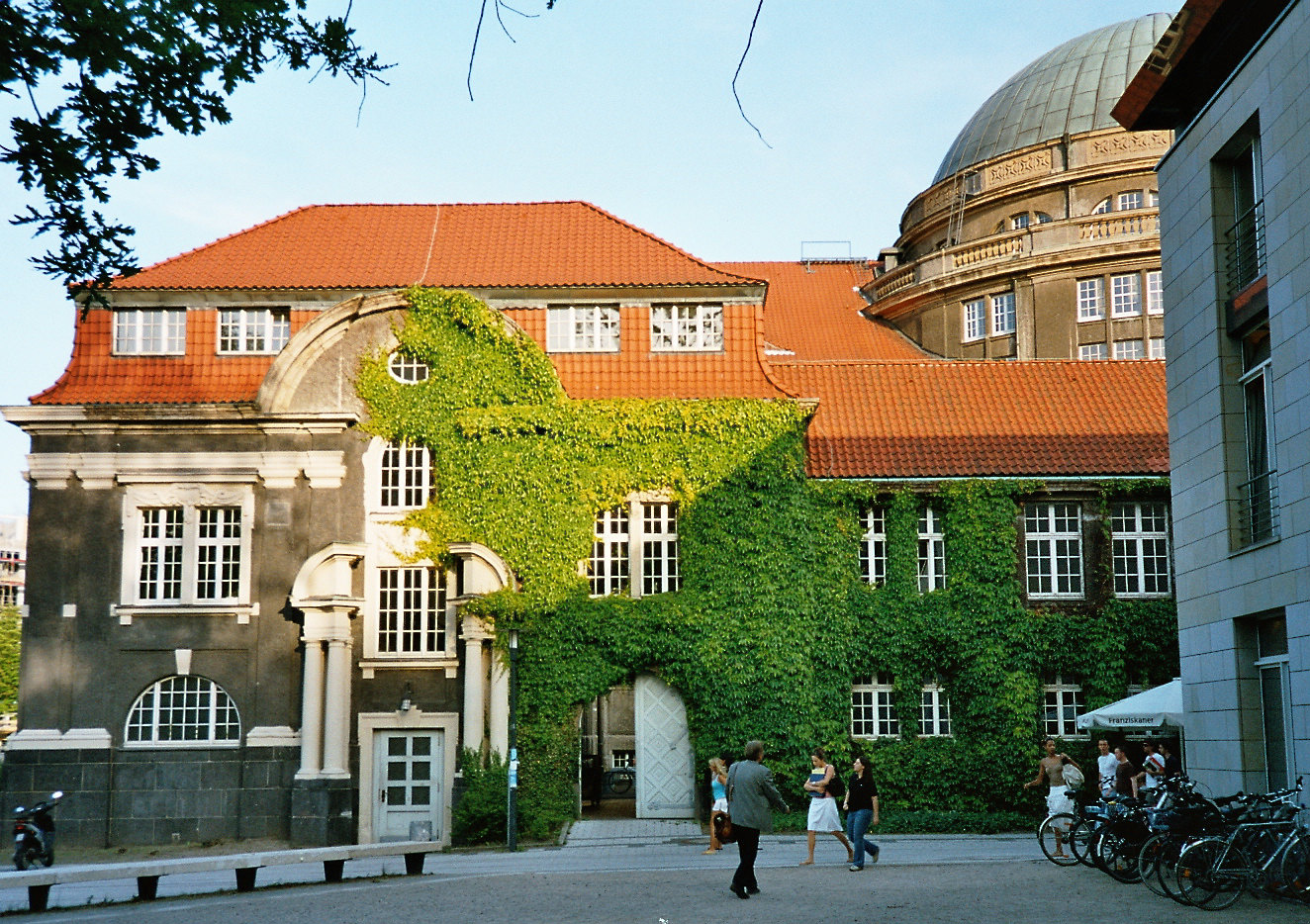
- Hamburg University

- Coat of arms

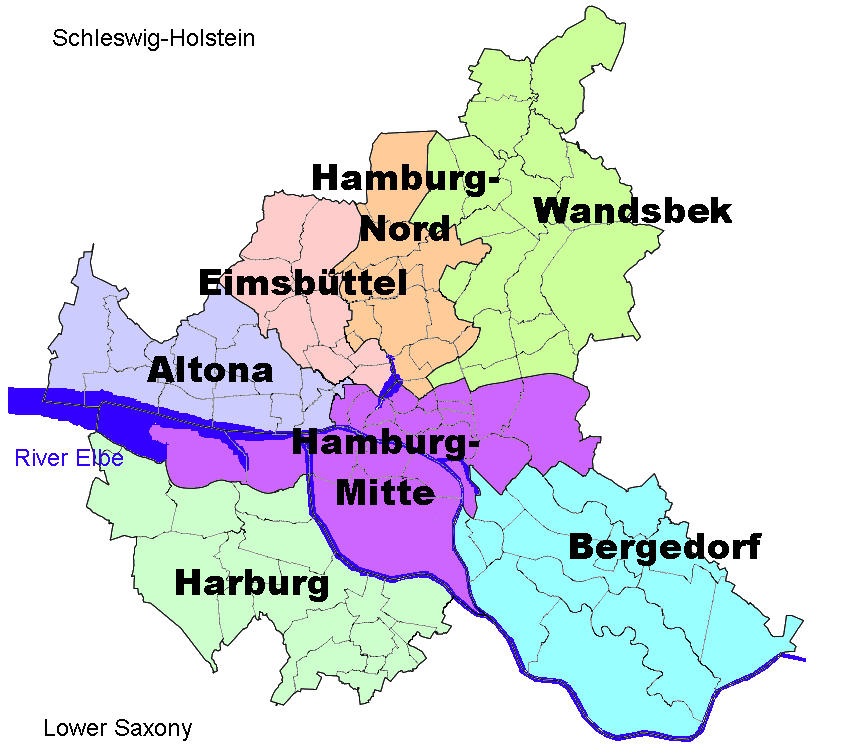
- Boroughs of Hamburg
- Interactive map of Eimsbüttel
- Location within Germany Location within Hamburg
- Coordinates: 53°34′28″N 9°57′34″E
- Country: Germany
- State: Hamburg
- City: Hamburg
- Subdivisions: 9 quarters

Area
  - Total: 50.1 km^{2} (19.3 sq mi)

Population (2024-12-31)
  - Total: 277,656
  - Density: 5,540/km^{2} (14,400/sq mi)
- Time zone: UTC+01:00 (CET)
  - Summer (DST): UTC+02:00 (CEST)
- Dialling codes: 040
- Vehicle registration: HH

Eimsbüttel (German pronunciation: [ˈaɪmsˌbʏtl̩]) is one of the seven boroughs (Bezirke) of Hamburg, Germany. In 2020, the borough had a population of 269,118.

== History ==
On March 1, 2008 Eimsbüttel lost part of its area to the borough Altona where it formed the Sternschanze quarter.

== Geography ==
In 2006 according to the statistical office of Hamburg and Schleswig-Holstein, the borough Eimsbüttel has a total area of 50.1 km^{2}.

The borough Eimsbüttel is split into nine quarters: Eidelstedt, Eimsbüttel, Harvestehude, Hoheluft-West, Lokstedt, Niendorf, Rotherbaum, Schnelsen and Stellingen. Located within this borough is former Jewish neighbourhood Grindel.

== Demographics ==
In 2006, the population of Eimsbüttel was 246,087. The population density was 4,915/km^{2} (12,730/sq mi). 19.3% were children under the age of 18, and 18.6% were 65 years of age or older. 13% were immigrants. 10,042 people were registered as unemployed.

In 1999 there were 140,694 households and 51.5% of all households were made up of individuals.

== Education ==
The University of Hamburg is located in the borough. In 2006 there were 32 primary schools and 20 secondary schools in Eimsbüttel.

== Politics ==
Subdivisions of Eimsbüttel

District parliament election of Eimsbüttel in 2024
Parties	%	±	Seats
Alliance 90/The Greens	29.6	▼7.6	15
Social Democratic Party	23.4	▲0.3	12
Christian Democratic Union	19.5	▲3.2	10
The Left	9.1	▼1.3	5
Alternative for Germany	6.2	▲1.3	3
Free Democratic Party	6.1	▼0.4	3
Volt	5.3	▲5.3	3
Total			51

== Culture ==
=== Sports ===
The Eimsbütteler TV is one of the sports clubs using the facilities in the Eimsbüttel borough. Founded in 1889 it is one of the older sports clubs of Hamburg with a widespread offer on departments.

== Infrastructure ==
=== Health systems ===
The Diakonie Klinikum Hamburg has several branches in Eimsbüttel borough and provides 450 beds in total. The hospital branch Alten Eichen, Jütländer Allee 48, with 208 beds and 5 departments is also a branch of the Diakonie Klinikum Hamburg and provides the capacity to dispatch emergency medical services.

The hospital Jerusalem, Moorkamp 2, is a lutheran hospital with 105 visiting consultants' beds in 9 departments.

In 2006, there were 172 day-care centers for children, 742 physicians in private practice and 69 pharmacies.

=== Transportation ===
Hamburg Dammtor railway station for long distance and city trains is located in the quarter Rotherbaum. Eimsbüttel borough is serviced by the rapid transit system of the city train and the underground railway with several other stations. Public transport is also provided by the buses of the Hamburger Verkehrsverbund.

The Bundesautobahn 7 (A7) is here also the European route E45 connecting Kaaresuvanto in Finland, with Gela in Italy, and passes the borough from the North to the South into the quarter Bahrenfeld. The Bundesautobahn 23 (A23) starts in Eimsbüttel borough and connects Hamburg with the town of Heide, Schleswig-Holstein. The exits Hamburg-Stellingen, Hamburg-Schnelsen and Hamburg-Schnelsen-Nord (Airport) for the A7 and the exit Hamburg-Eidelstedt for the A23 are located in Eimsbüttel borough.

According to the Department of Motor Vehicles (Kraftfahrt-Bundesamt), in the borough Eimsbüttel were 91,871 private cars registered (376 cars/1000 people).

== Notes ==
=== References ===
- Act of the areal organisation, July 6, 2006 Gesetz über die räumliche Gliederung der Freien und Hansestadt Hamburg (RäumGiG) (in German)
- Statistical office Hamburg and Schleswig-Holstein Statistisches Amt für Hamburg und Schleswig-Holstein, official website (in German)
- Hospitals in Hamburg 2006, Government Agency for Social Affairs, Family Affairs, Health and Environment of Hamburg website (in German)
