= Harvestehude =

- Quarter of Hamburg
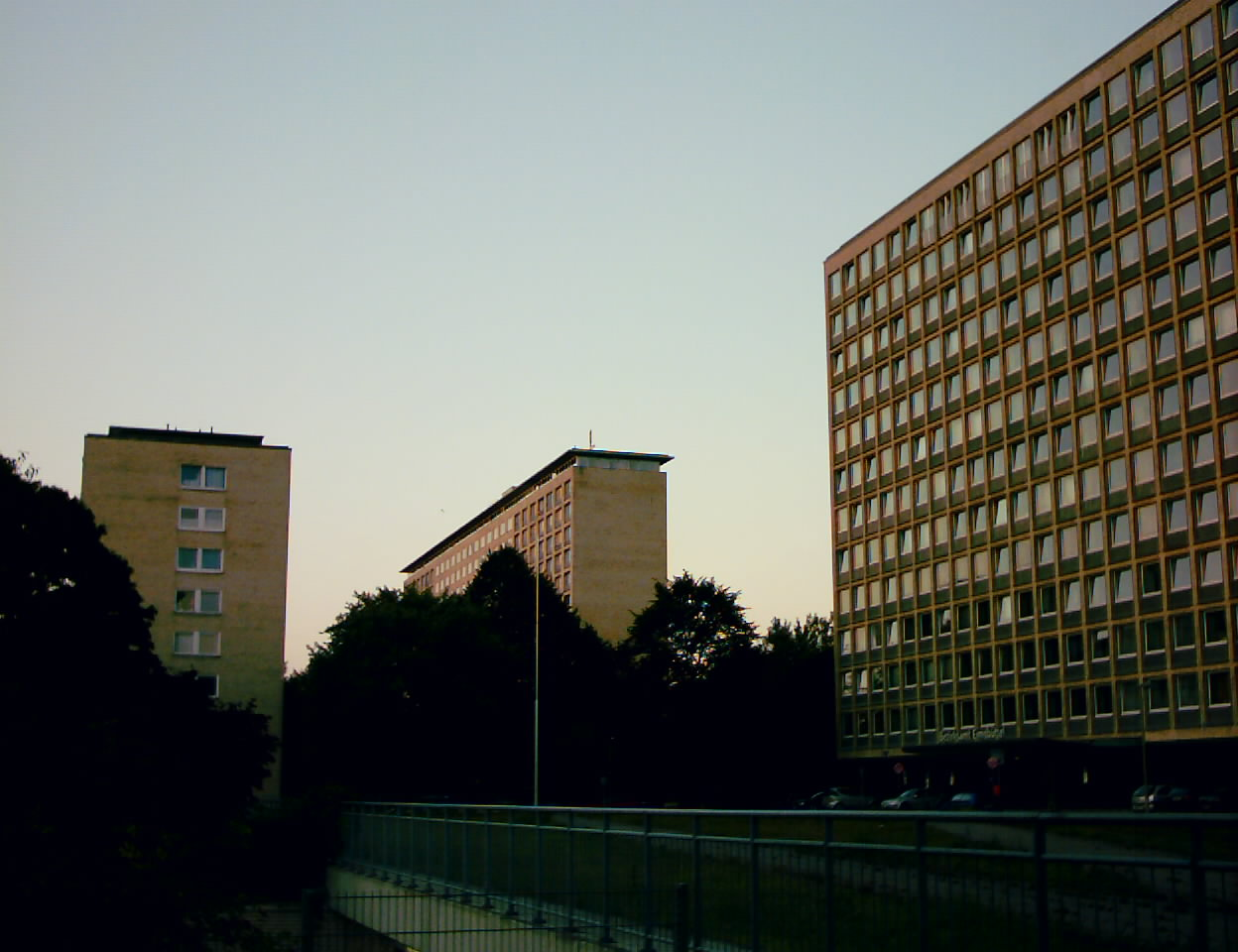
- Grindel Highrises, the first in Hamburg

- Location of Harvestehude in Hamburg
- Interactive map of Harvestehude
- Location within Germany Location within Hamburg
- Coordinates: 53.57765°N 9.98893°E
- Country: Germany
- State: Hamburg
- City: Hamburg
- Borough: Hamburg-Eimsbüttel

Area
  - Total: 2.0 km^{2} (0.77 sq mi)

Population (2024-12-31)
  - Total: 17,962
  - Density: 9,000/km^{2} (23,000/sq mi)
- Time zone: UTC+01:00 (CET)
  - Summer (DST): UTC+02:00 (CEST)
- Dialling codes: 040
- Vehicle registration: HH

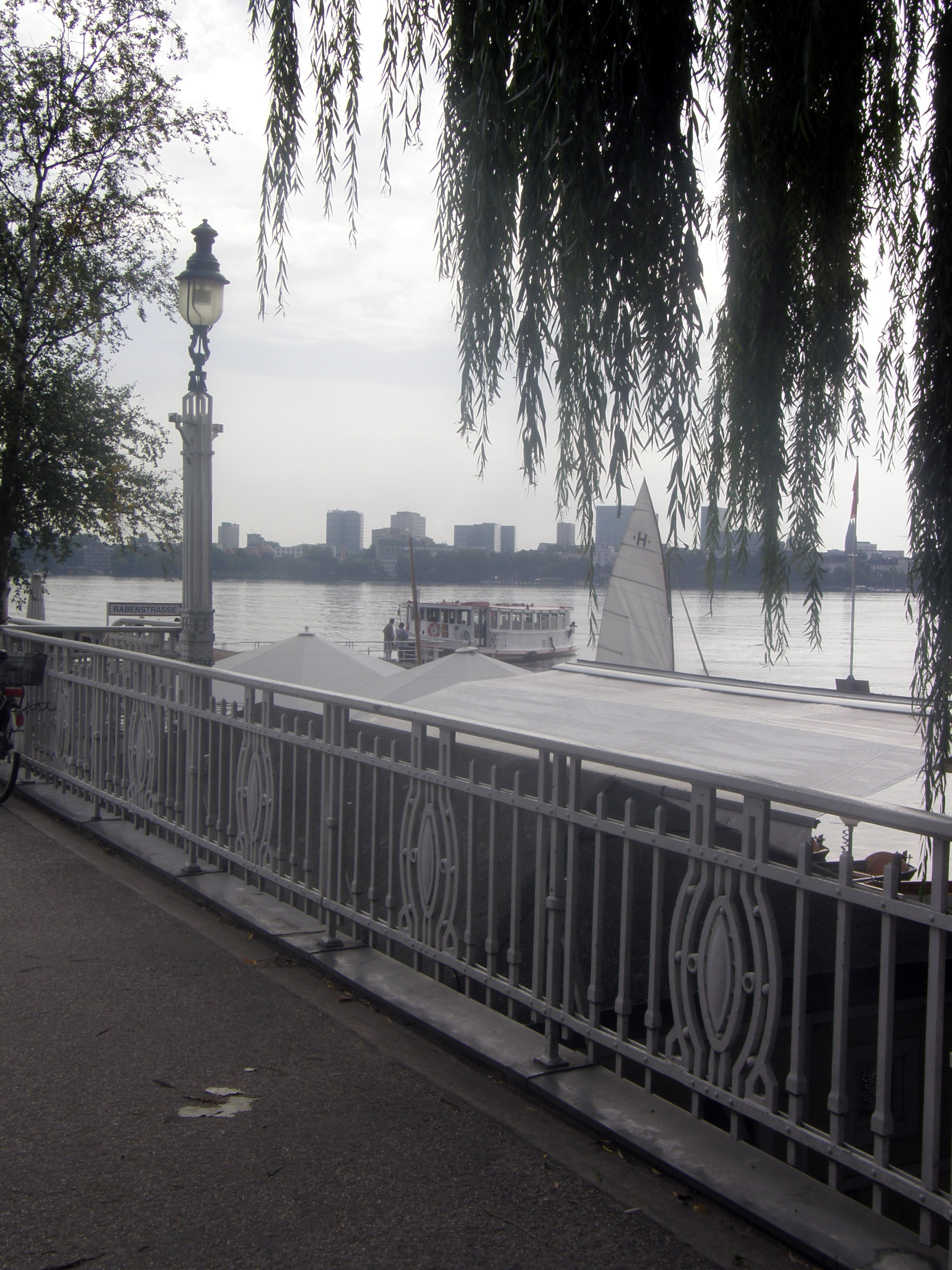
View over the Außenalster

Harvestehude (German pronunciation: [ˌhaʁvɛstəˈhuːdə]; Hamburgisch: Harvstehuud) is a quarter of Hamburg, Germany, in the borough of Eimsbüttel. It is located on the eastern boundaries of the borough near lake Außenalster.

== Geography ==
Harvestehude borders the quarters of Rotherbaum, Eimsbüttel, and Hoheluft-West, all within the Eimsbüttel borough, as well as Hoheluft-Ost, Eppendorf, and Winterhude in the neighbouring Hamburg-Nord borough. Harvestehude is located on a Geest ridge west of the Außenalster. To the north the canal of Isebekkanal separates Harvestehude of Hoheluft-Ost and Eppendorf.

== History ==
The name is derived from the former name of the local St. John's Monastery, Herwardeshude, which had been located in Altona near today's street and small stream of Pepermölenbek at least since 1246. Herward was a common name in the 12th and 13th century, so it is assumed that the name means a stockyard near a ferry dock (Hude), which was founded by a man called Herward. Later, in 1295, the monastery moved to today's Harvestehude area, transferring the monastery's name to the new area. Hamburg history writer Otto Beneke noticed that the place was also called Herbstehude by some, which was according to him indeed correct, because Herbst (autumn) translates to Harvest in Low German. In 1530, the monastery was demolished, and the area came under municipal administration.

Contrary to what its name suggests, the church of St. John's Harvestehude, which was built 1880–82, is today located in the neighbouring Rotherbaum quarter. Conversely, the Tennis court Am Rothenbaum and the NDR broadcasting center ("Funkhaus am Rothenbaum") are located in the quarter of Harvestehude.

== Politics ==
Hamburg state elections:

Election	SPD	Greens	CDU	FDP	Left	AfD	Others
2020	34,0	27,8	12,8	10,8	7,4	2,7	4,5
2015	37,9	13,3	17,6	17,0	7,4	3,7	3,1
2011	41,4	13,3	23,2	12,9	5,3	–	3,9
2008	28,5	10,8	47,7	7,4	4,5	–	1,0
2004	26,1	15,6	50,3	4,4	–	–	3,6
2001	35,0	12,1	27,0	11,3	0,3	–	14,3
1997	28,1	19,0	34,3	6,9	0,7	–	11,0
1993	31,3	19,9	26,9	8,0	–	–	13,9
1991	36,5	11,7	39,1	9,5	0,8	–	2,4
1987	37,3	9,5	41,6	10,8	–	–	0,8
1986	29,2	15,1	45,4	9,6	–	–	0,7
Dec. 1982	36,8	11,2	46,8	4,5	–	–	0,7
June 1982	29,8	12,2	50,5	6,1	–	–	1,4
1978	32,8	7,5	48,8	7,8	–	–	3,1
1974	26,7	–	56,3	13,2	–	–	3,8
1970	36,5	–	46,2	12,1	–	–	5,2
1966	38,5	–	45,0	10,9	–	–	5,6
