= Lokstedt =

Quarter in Hamburg, Germany

- Quarter of Hamburg
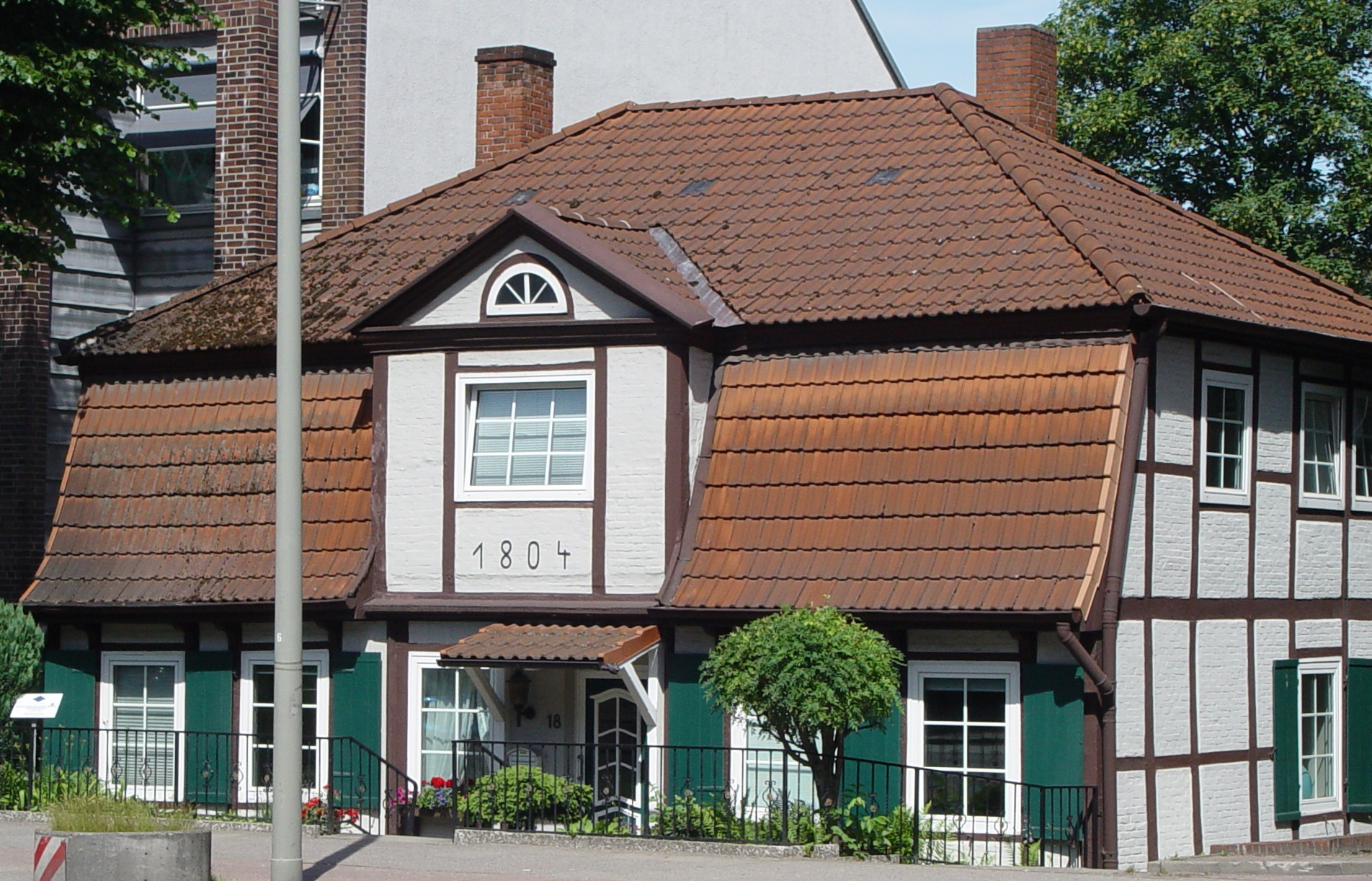
- Old house in the quarter of Lokstedt

- Location of Lokstedt within Hamburg
- Interactive map of Lokstedt
- Location within Germany Location within Hamburg
- Coordinates: 53°36′11″N 9°57′23″E
- Country: Germany
- State: Hamburg
- City: Hamburg
- Borough: Eimsbüttel

Population (2024-12-31)
  - Total: 31,666
- Time zone: UTC+01:00 (CET)
  - Summer (DST): UTC+02:00 (CEST)

Lokstedt (German: [ˈlɔk.ʃteːt]) is a quarter of Hamburg, Germany in the Eimsbüttel borough.
