= Statt Party =

Statt Party STATT Partei - Die Unabhängigen
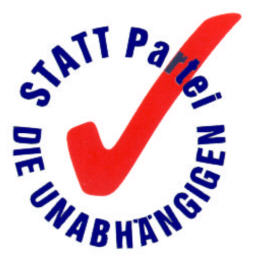
- Leader: Robert W. Hugo
- Founded: 1993
- Headquarters: Hamburg
- Membership (March 2001): 200
- Ideology: Populism

Website
- statt-partei.de

The Statt Party (German: STATT - Partei Die Unabhängigen) is a minor political party in Germany.

Founded in 1993 in Hamburg, the party won 5.6% in the Hamburg state election and formed a coalition with the Social Democratic Party of Germany. In 1997, the party lost all seats.
