= 1987 Hamburg state election =

State election in Hamburg, Germany

← 1986	17 May 1987	1991 →

All 120 seats in the Hamburg Parliament 61 seats needed for a majority
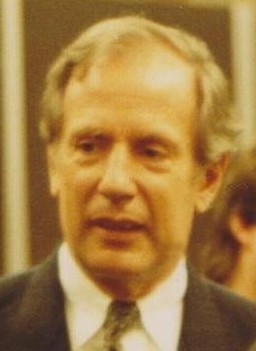

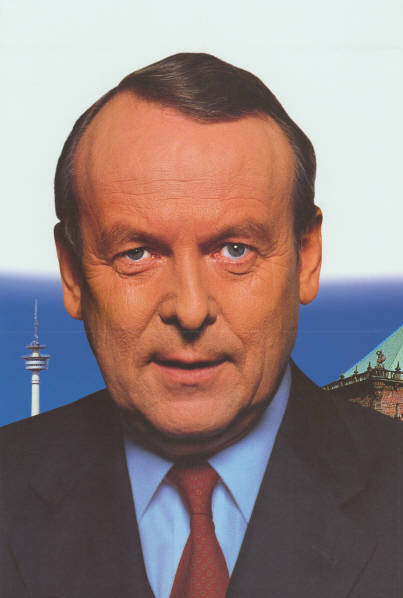
	First party	Second party
Leader	Klaus von Dohnanyi	Hartmut Perschau
Party	SPD	CDU
Last election	53 seats, 41.7%	54 seats, 41.9%
Seats won	55	49
Seat change	▲2	▼5
Popular vote	442,670	398,686
Percentage	45.0%	40.5%
Swing	▲3.3 pp	▼1.4 pp
	Third party	Fourth party
Party	Greens	FDP
Last election	13 seats, 10.4%	0 seats, 4.8%
Seats won	8	8
Seat change	▼5	▲8
Popular vote	69,148	64,389
Percentage	7%	6.5%
Swing	▼3.4 pp	▲1.7 pp
Mayor before election
Klaus von Dohnanyi
SPD
Elected Mayor
Klaus von Dohnanyi
SPD

The 1987 Hamburg state election was held on 17 May 1987 to elect members of the 13th Hamburg Parliament. It was the first time in nine years that the FDP has held a seat in the parliament, which resulted in a social-liberal coalition.

== Election Result ==
Summary of the 17 May 1987 election results for the Hamburg Parliament
Party	Votes	%	+/-pp	Seats	+/-	Seats %
Social Democratic Party (SPD)	442,670	45	▲3.3	55	▲2	45.8
Christian Democratic Union (CDU)	398,686	40.5	▼1.4	49	▼5	40.8
Alliance 90/The Greens (Grüne)	69,148	7	▼3.4	8	▼5	6.7
Free Democratic Party (FDP)	64,389	6.5	▲1.7	8	▲8	6.7

Popular vote
SPD	45%
CDU	40.5%
B'90/GRÜNE	7%
FDP	6.5%

Bürgerschaft seats
SPD	45.8%
CDU	40.8%
B'90/GRÜNE	6.7%
FDP	6.7%
