= 1991 Hamburg state election =

State election in Hamburg, Germany

- 2 June 1991

All 121 seats in the Hamburg Parliament 61 seats needed for a majority
- Turnout: 819,773 (66.1%) ▼13.4%
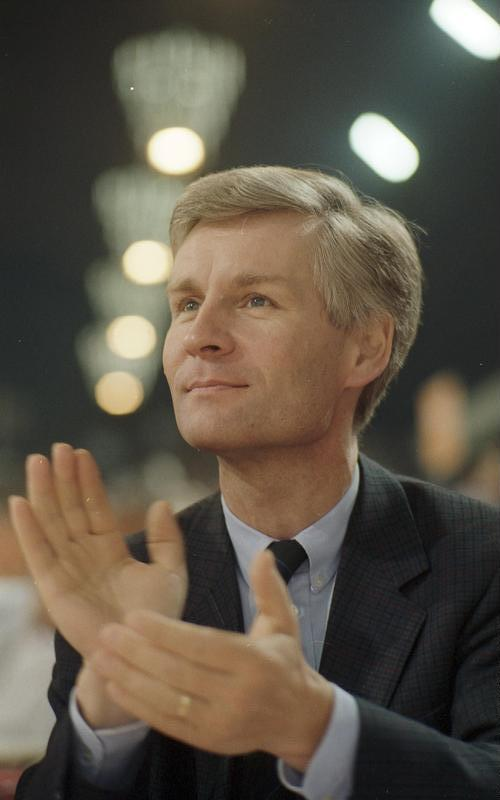

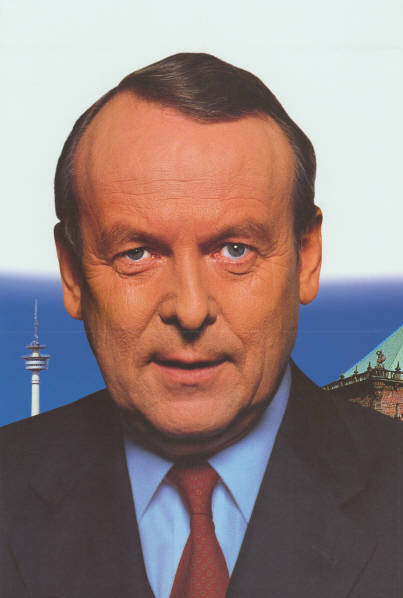
	First party	Second party
Leader	Henning Voscherau	Hartmut Perschau
Party	SPD	CDU
Last election	55 seats, 45.0%	49 seats, 40.5%
Seats won	61	44
Seat change	▲6	▼5
Popular vote	393,414	287,467
Percentage	48.0%	35.1%
Swing	▲3.0%	▼5.4%
	Third party	Fourth party
Party	Greens	FDP
Last election	9 seats, 7.2%	8 seats, 6.5%
Seats won	9	7
Seat change	▲1	▼1
Popular vote	59,262	44,460
Percentage	7.2%	5.4%
Swing	▲0.2%	▼1.1%
Mayor before election
Henning Voscherau
SPD
Elected Mayor
Henning Voscherau
SPD

The 1991 Hamburg state election was held on 2 June 1991 to elect the members of the 14th Hamburg Parliament. The incumbent government was a coalition of the Social Democratic Party (SPD) and Free Democratic Party (FDP) led by First Mayor Henning Voscherau. The FDP declined to continue the coalition after the SPD won a bare majority of seats; it formed government alone, and Voscherau continued in office.

After the election, a group of CDU members brought a complaint over deficiencies in the party's nomination process to the Constitutional Court of Hamburg. On 4 May 1993, the court declared the statewide election and five of the seven district elections to be invalid and ordered a repeat. The Bürgerschaft voted nearly unanimously to dissolve itself on 22 June, leading to the 1993 Hamburg state election.

== Parties ==
The table below lists parties represented in the 13th Hamburg Parliament.

Name		Ideology	Leader(s)	1987 result	
Name		Ideology	Leader(s)	Votes (%)	Seats
SPD	Social Democratic Party of Germany; Sozialdemokratische Partei Deutschlands	Social democracy	Henning Voscherau	45.0%	55 / 120
CDU	Christian Democratic Union of Germany; Christlich Demokratische Union Deutschlands	Christian democracy	Hartmut Perschau	40.5%	49 / 120
GAL	Green Alternative List; Grün-Alternative-Liste Hamburg	Green politics		7.0%	8 / 120
FDP	Free Democratic Party; Freie Demokratische Partei	Classical liberalism		6.5%	8 / 120

== Election result ==
Summary of the 2 June 1991 election results for the Hamburg Parliament
Party	Votes	%	+/-	Seats	+/-	Seats %
Social Democratic Party (SPD)	393,414	48.0	▲3.0	61	▲6	50.4
Christian Democratic Union (CDU)	287,467	35.1	▼5.4	44	▼5	36.4
Green Alternative List (GAL)	59,262	7.2	▲0.2	9	▲1	7.4
Free Democratic Party (FDP)	44,460	5.4	▼1.1	7	▼1	5.8
The Republicans (REP)	9,959	1.2	▲1.2	0	±0	0
The Grays – Gray Panthers (GRAUE)	7,219	0.9	New	0	New	0
Others	17,992	2.2		0	±0	0
Total	819,773	100.0		121	▲1	
Voter turnout		66.1	▼13.4			

Popular Vote
SPD	47.99%
CDU	35.07%
GAL	7.23%
FDP	5.42%
Other	4.29%

Bürgerschaft seats
SPD	50.41%
CDU	36.36%
GAL	7.44%
FDP	5.79%

== Sources ==
- Bürgerschaft Hamburg Landesstimmen
