= December 1982 Hamburg state election =

State election in West Germany

- 19 December 1982

All 120 seats of the Hamburg Parliament.
- Turnout: 84.0% ▲7.4 pp
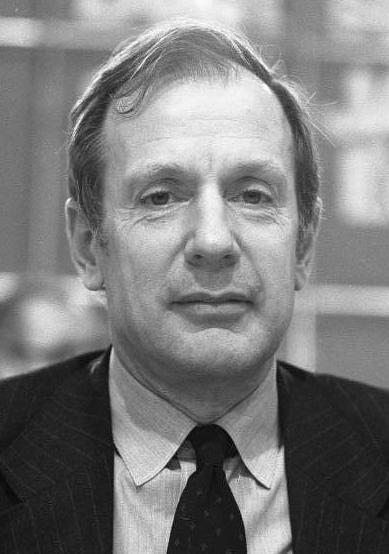

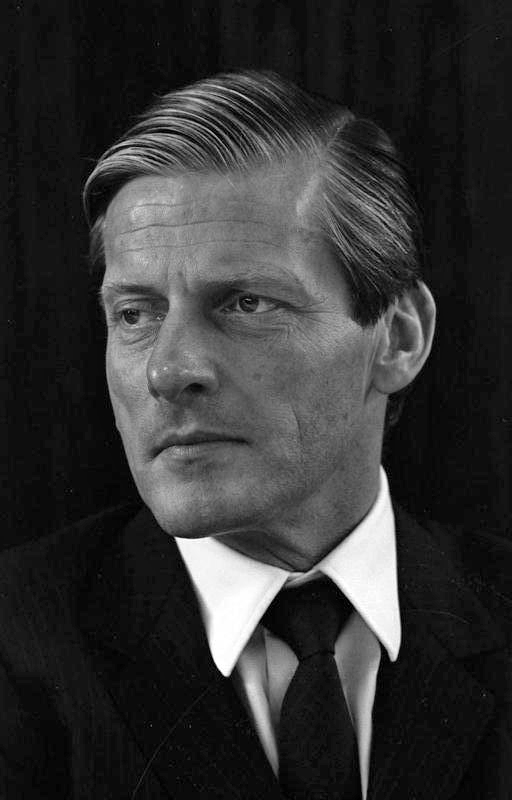
	First party	Second party	Third party
Leader	Klaus von Dohnanyi	Walther Leisler Kiep
Party	SPD	CDU	Greens
Last election	42.7%	43.2%	7.7%
Seats before	55	56	9
Seats won	64	48	8
Seat change	▲9	▼8	▼1
Popular vote	530,117	398,518	70,501
Percentage	51.3%	38.6%	6.8%
Swing	▲8.6 pp	▼4.6 pp	▼0.9 pp

An election was held in Hamburg on 19 December 1982. The Social Democratic Party won unexpectedly against the Christian Democratic Union.

== Results ==
Party	Votes	%	Seats	+/–
Social Democratic Party	530,117	51.33	64	+9
Christian Democratic Union	398,518	38.59	48	–8
The Greens	70,501	6.83	8	–1
Free Democratic Party	26,485	2.56	0	0
German Communist Party	3,885	0.38	0	0
Hamburg List for Stopping Immigration	2,804	0.27	0	0
Free Social Union – Democratic Centre	335	0.03	0	New
European Workers Party	168	0.02	0	New
Total	1,032,813	100.00	120	0
Valid votes	1,032,813	99.19		
Invalid/blank votes	8,445	0.81		
Total votes	1,041,258	100.00		
Registered voters/turnout	1,239,944	83.98		
Source: Federal Election Commission
