= 1993 Hamburg state election =

State election in Hamburg, Germany

- 19 September 1993

All 121 seats in the Hamburg Parliament 61 seats needed for a majority
- Turnout: 844,902 (69.9%) ▲3.8%
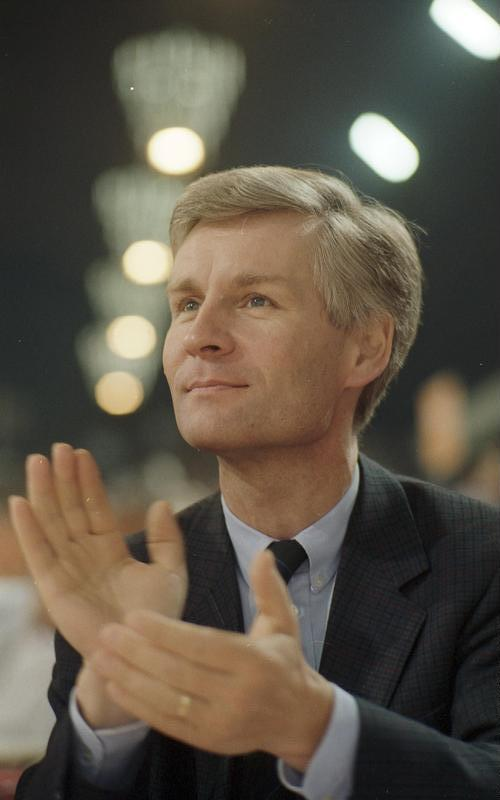
	First party	Second party
Leader	Henning Voscherau
Party	SPD	CDU
Last election	61 seats, 48.0%	44 seats, 35.1%
Seats won	58	36
Seat change	▼3	▼8
Popular vote	341,688	212,186
Percentage	40.4%	25.1%
Swing	▼7.6%	▼10.0%
	Third party	Fourth party
Party	Greens	Statt
Last election	9 seats, 7.2%	Did not exist
Seats won	19	8
Seat change	▲10	▲8
Popular vote	114,263	46,894
Percentage	13.5%	5.6%
Swing	▲6.3%	New party
Mayor before election
Henning Voscherau
SPD
Elected Mayor
Henning Voscherau
SPD

The 1993 Hamburg state election was held on 19 September 1993 to elect the members of the 15th Hamburg Parliament.

After the 1991 election, a group of CDU members brought a complaint over deficiencies in the party's nomination process to the Constitutional Court of Hamburg. On 4 May 1993, the court declared the statewide election and five of the seven district elections to be invalid and ordered a repeat. It did not order by-elections for the remaining term, instead allowing the parliament to dissolve itself and hold new elections for a full term. The parliament voted nearly unanimously for dissolution on 22 June. Markus Wegner, one of the complaining CDU members, founded the Statt Party to contest this election.

The incumbent government of the Social Democratic Party (SPD) lost its majority. The Statt Party succeeded in entering Parliament with 5.6% of the vote. The SPD did not enter into a formal coalition with them, but instead a "cooperation" agreement in which the Statt Party supported the SPD minority government and nominated two technocratic senators from outside the party. First Mayor Henning Voscherau continued in office.

== Parties ==
The table below lists parties represented in the 14th Hamburg Parliament.

Name		Ideology	Leader(s)	1991 result	
Name		Ideology	Leader(s)	Votes (%)	Seats
SPD	Social Democratic Party of Germany; Sozialdemokratische Partei Deutschlands	Social democracy	Henning Voscherau	48.0%	61 / 121
CDU	Christian Democratic Union of Germany; Christlich Demokratische Union Deutschlands	Christian democracy		35.1%	44 / 121
GAL	Green Alternative List; Grün-Alternative-Liste Hamburg	Green politics		7.2%	9 / 121
FDP	Free Democratic Party; Freie Demokratische Partei	Classical liberalism		5.4%	7 / 121

== Election result ==
Summary of the 19 September 1993 election results for the Hamburg Parliament
Party	Votes	%	+/-	Seats	+/-	Seats %
Social Democratic Party (SPD)	341,688	40.4	▼7.6	58	▼3	47.9
Christian Democratic Union (CDU)	212,186	25.1	▼10.0	36	▼8	29.8
Green Alternative List (GAL)	114,261	13.5	▲6.3	19	▲10	6.6
Statt Party (STATT)	46,894	5.6	New	8	New	6.6
The Republicans (REP)	40,856	4.8	▲3.6	0	±0	0
Free Democratic Party (FDP)	35,236	4.2	▼1.2	0	▼7	0
German People's Union (DVU)	23,618	2.8	▲2.8	0	±0	0
The Grays – Gray Panthers (GRAUE)	13,329	1.6	▲0.7	0	±0	0
Others	16,832	2.0		0	±0	0
Total	844,902	100.0		121	±0	
Voter turnout		69.9	▲3.8			

Popular Vote
SPD	40.44%
CDU	25.11%
GAL	13.52%
STATT	5.55%
REP	4.84%
FDP	4.17%
DVU	2.80%
Other	2.57%

Bürgerschaft seats
SPD	47.93%
CDU	29.75%
GAL	15.70%
STATT	6.61%

== See also ==
- Elections in Germany
- Elections in Hamburg
- Hamburg state elections in the Weimar Republic
