= Henning Voscherau =

German politician (1941–2016)

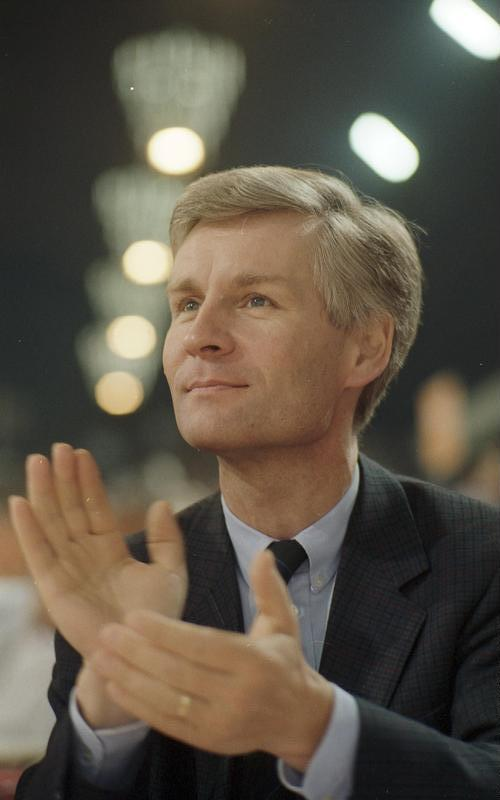

First Mayor of Hamburg
- In office 8 June 1988 – 8 October 1997
- President: Richard von Weizsäcker; Roman Herzog
- Chancellor: Helmut Kohl
- Preceded by: Klaus von Dohnanyi
- Succeeded by: Ortwin Runde

President of the Bundesrat
- In office 1990–1991
- President: Richard von Weizsäcker
- Chancellor: Helmut Kohl
- Preceded by: Walter Momper
- Succeeded by: Alfred Gomolka

Personal details
- Born: 13 August 1941 Hamburg, Germany
- Died: 24 August 2016 (aged 75)
- Party: Social Democratic Party of Germany
- Education: University of Hamburg

Henning Voscherau (13 August 1941 – 24 August 2016) was a German politician who was a member of the Social Democratic Party of Germany. He was the First Mayor of his home city of Hamburg from 1988 to 1997, serving as President of the Bundesrat from 1990 to 1991.

== Education ==
After receiving his high-school diploma, he studied law and economics at the University of Hamburg, where he graduated in 1969. Since 1974 he has been working as a notary in Hamburg, only during his terms as First Mayor of Hamburg (from 1988 until 1997) taking a break from his job.

== Political career ==
In 1966 Henning Voscherau joined the Social Democratic Party (SPD). His political career began in 1970 when he became a member of the district assembly in Wandsbek. Four years later, in 1974, he was elected as a member of the Hamburg Parliament (German: Hamburgische Bürgerschaft). From 1981 to 1989 Voscherau was vice chairman of the Hamburg SPD, and in 1982 he also became chairman of the SPD parliamentary group in the Hamburg city assembly, a post from which he resigned in 1987 after having differences with the mayor Klaus von Dohnanyi over dealing with illegal squatters in Hamburg (in the Hamburg Hafenstrasse area).

Voscherau became First Mayor of the Free and Hanseatic City Hamburg on 8 June 1988, and held this office until 8 October 1997. He resigned from the mayor's office since he intended to build a coalition with the local Statt Party after winning the 1997 election, instead the Hamburg's SPD favoured a coalition with the Green Party. Although he stepped down from active politics in Hamburg that year, and started working as notary again, he remained vice president of the SPD until 2001.

In late 2005 to early 2006 Voscherau tried briefly to return to political life in Hamburg, when he announced he would run for Hamburg mayor again. This was met by stiff resistance in his own party, and in May 2006 at an SPD party convention in Hamburg he withdrew his bid for office.

== Personal life ==
Henning Voscherau was married and had three children. His father was Carl Voscherau, a German stage and film actor, his brother Eggert is member of the board of directors of BASF.
