= Hamburg state elections in the Weimar Republic =

German state elections

Elections in the Free and Hanseatic City of Hamburg (Freie und Hansestadt Hamburg) to its state parliament, the Hamburgische Bürgerschaft, during the Weimar Republic were held at irregular intervals between 1919 and 1932. Results with regard to the percentage of the vote won and the number of seats allocated to each party are presented in the tables below. On 31 March 1933, the sitting Bürgerschaft was dissolved by the Nazi-controlled central government and reconstituted to reflect the distribution of seats in the national Reichstag. The Bürgerschaft subsequently was formally abolished as a result of the "Law on the Reconstruction of the Reich" of 30 January 1934 which replaced the German federal system with a unitary state.

== 1919 ==
The 1919 Hamburg state election was held on 16 March 1919 to elect the 160 members of the Bürgerschaft.

1919 Hamburg Landtag election

Party Abbreviation	%	seats
SPD	50,5%	82
DDP	20,5%	33
DVP	8,6%	13
USPD	8,1%	13
Hamburgischer Wirtschaftsbund	4,2%	7
DNVP	2,9%	4
Grundeigentümer Wahlbüro	2,5%	4
Zentrum	1,2%	2
Hamburgische Wirtschaftspartei	0,4%	1
Vereinigte Bürgervereine der inneren Stadt	0,4%	1

== 1921 ==
The 1921 Hamburg state election was held on 20 February 1921 to elect the 160 members of the Bürgerschaft.

1921 Hamburg Landtag election

Party Abbreviation	%	seats
SPD	40,6%	67
DDP	14,1%	23
DVP	13,9%	23
DNVP	11,3%	18
KPD	11,0%	18
Hamburgischer Wirtschaftsbund	3,5%	5
Liste Dr. Eddelbüttel	2,3%	3
USPD	1,4%	2
Zentrum	1,2%	1

== 1924 ==
The 1924 Hamburg state election was held on 26 October 1924 to elect the 160 members of the Bürgerschaft.

1924 Hamburg Landtag election

Party	Votes	%	Seats	+/–
Social Democratic Party of Germany	173,358	32.4	53	–14
German National People's Party	90,626	17.0	28	+10
Communist Party of Germany	78,522	14.7	24	+6
German People's Party	74,834	14.0	23	0
German Democratic Party	70,622	13.2	21	–2
Völkischsozialer Block	13,495	2.5	4	New
Centre Party	8,503	1.6	2	+1
Mieterverband Groß-Hamburg e.V.	7,024	1.3	2	New
Gewerbetreibende	6,787	1.3	2	New
Wohnungssuchende	3,490	0.7	1	New
Grundeigentümerliste »Carl E. A. Fehmerling«	2,828	0.5	0	New
Freiwirtschaftsbund F.F.F.	2,295	0.4	0	New
Independent Social Democratic Party of Germany	1,588	0.3	0	–2
Volkswirtschaftsbund	266	0.1	0	New
Hanseatentum	88	0.0	0	New
Invalid/blank votes	2,995	–	–	–
Total	537,321	100	160	0
Registered voters/turnout	813,396	66.1	–	
Source: Elections in the Weimar Republic

== 1927 ==
The 1927 Hamburg state election was held on 9 October 1927 to elect the 160 members of the Bürgerschaft.

1927 Hamburg Landtag election

Party	Votes	%	Seats	+/–
Social Democratic Party of Germany	247,469	38.2	63	+10
Communist Party of Germany	110,239	17.0	27	+3
German National People's Party	98,817	15.2	25	–3
German People's Party	72,432	11.2	18	–5
German Democratic Party	65,295	10.1	16	–5
Mittelstands-Partei	27,163	4.2	6	New
Centre Party	9,774	1.5	2	0
Nazi Party	9,754	1.5	2	New
Reich Party for Civil Rights and Deflation	7,762	1.2	1	New
Invalid/blank votes	6,351	–	–	–
Total	655,056	100	160	0
Registered voters/turnout	871,707	75.2	–	–
Source: Elections in the Weimar Republic

== 1928 ==
The 1928 Hamburg state election was held on 19 February 1928 to elect the 160 members of the Bürgerschaft.

1928 Hamburg Landtag election

Party	Votes	%	Seats	+/–
Social Democratic Party of Germany	246,685	35.9	60	–3
Communist Party of Germany	114,257	16.7	27	0
German National People's Party	94,048	13.7	22	–3
German Democratic Party	87,553	12.8	21	+5
German People's Party	85,507	12.5	20	+2
Mittelstands-Partei	20,136	2.9	4	–2
Nazi Party	14,760	2.2	3	+1
Centre Party	9,402	1.4	2	0
Reich Party for Civil Rights and Deflation	5,609	0.8	1	0
Angestellte und Beamte	1,598	0.2	0	New
Rechtspartei für Aufwertung und Recht	1,331	0.2	0	New
Freiwirtschaftliche Arbeitspartei	1,038	0.2	0	New
Internationale Kommunisten	738	0.1	0	New
Mieterschutz-Wohnungsnot	714	0.1	0	New
Deutsche Reformpartei	713	0.1	0	New
Independent Social Democratic Party of Germany	706	0.1	0	New
Völkischsozialer Block	669	0.1	0	New
Wohnungssuchende und Neubaumieter	551	0.1	0	New
Hermann Abel	201	0.0	0	New
Republikanische Partei Deutschlands	114	0.0	0	New
Invalid/blank votes	5,636	–	–	–
Total	691,966	100	160	0
Registered voters/turnout	876,371	79.0	–	–
Source: Elections in the Weimar Republic

== 1931 ==
The 1931 Hamburg state election was held on 27 September 1931 to elect the 160 members of the Bürgerschaft.

1931 Hamburg Landtag election

Party	Votes	%	Seats	+/–
Social Democratic Party of Germany	214,553	27.8	46	–14
Nazi Party	202,506	26.3	43	+40
Communist Party of Germany	168,674	21.9	35	+8
German State Party	67,105	8.7	14	New
German National People's Party	43,278	5.6	9	–13
German People's Party	36,927	4.8	7	–13
Reich Party of the German Middle Class	11,375	1.5	2	New
Christian Social People's Service	10,858	1.4	2	New
Centre Party	10,798	1.4	2	0
Antikapitalistische Einheitsfront	1,956	0.3	0	New
Reich Party for Civil Rights and Deflation	1,156	0.2	0	–1
Freiwirtschaftliche Partei Deutschlands	987	0.1	0	New
Notgemeinschaft bedrohter Existenzen	510	0.1	0	New
Independent Social Democratic Party of Germany	484	0.1	0	0
Communist Party of Germany (Opposition)	315	0.0	0	New
Invalid/blank votes	9,252	–	–	–
Total	780,734	100	160	0
Registered voters/turnout	932,180	83.8	–	–
Source: Elections in the Weimar Republic

== 1932 ==
The 1932 Hamburg state election was held on 24 April 1932 to elect the 160 members of the Bürgerschaft.

1932 Hamburg Landtag election

Party	Votes	%	Seats	+/–
Nazi Party	233,750	31.2	51	+8
Social Democratic Party of Germany	226,242	30.2	49	+3
Communist Party of Germany	119,481	16.0	26	–9
German State Party	84,146	11.2	18	+4
German National People's Party	32,356	4.3	7	–2
German People's Party	23,807	3.2	5	–2
Centre Party	10,023	1.3	2	0
Christian Social People's Service	7,725	1.0	1	–1
Reich Party of the German Middle Class	4,880	0.7	1	–1
Sozialistische Arbeiterpartei	2,302	0.3	0	New
Volkskonservative Vereinigung Hamburg	1,357	0.2	0	New
Die Erwerbslosen	1,249	0.2	0	New
Menschheitspartei	521	0.1	0	New
Nationale Freiheitspartei Deutschlands	503	0.1	0	New
Freisinnige Partei Deutschlands	96	0.0	0	New
Invalid/blank votes	5,633	–	–	–
Total	754,071	100	160	0
Registered voters/turnout	936,441	80.5	–	–
Source: Elections in the Weimar Republic

== See also ==
- Elections in Hamburg
- Carl Vincent Krogmann
- 2020 Hamburg state election
