= 2001 Hamburg state election =

State election in Hamburg, Germany

- 23 September 2001

All 121 seats in the Hamburg Parliament 61 seats needed for a majority
- Turnout: 850,668 (71.1%) ▲2.4%
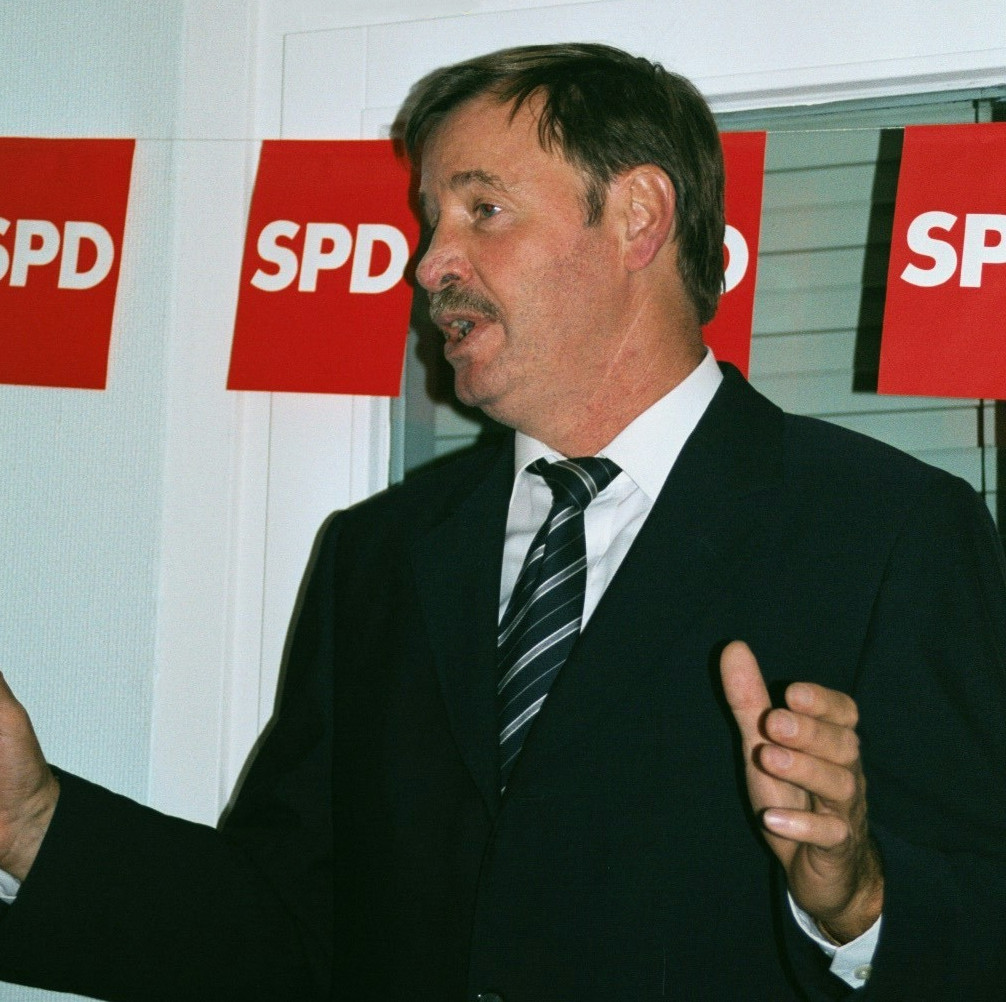

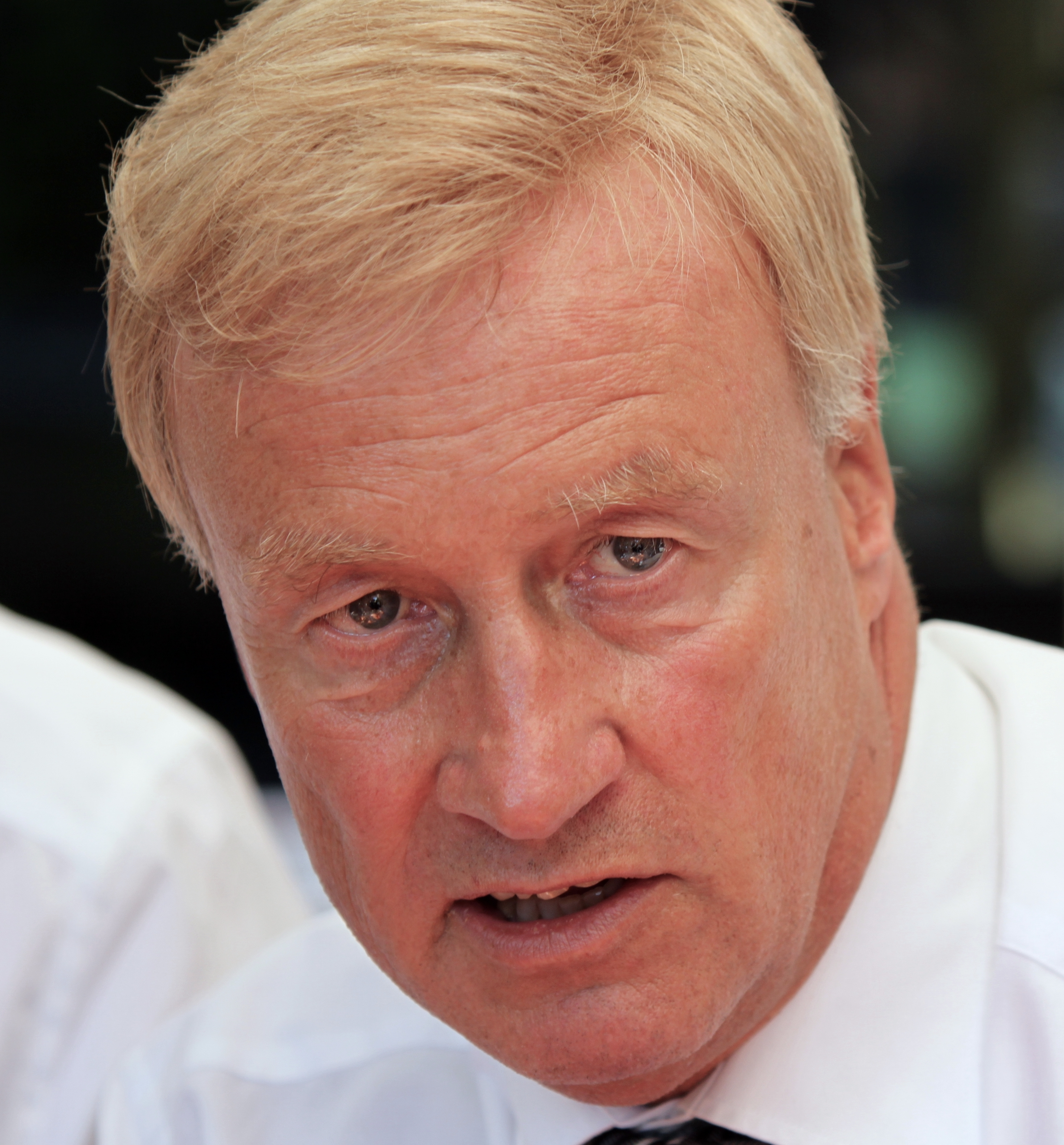
| | First party | Second party | Third party |
|---|---|---|---|
| Leader | Ortwin Runde | Ole von Beust | Ronald Schill |
| Party | SPD | CDU | Schill |
| Last election | 54 seats, 36.2% | 46 seats, 30.7% | Did not exist |
| Seats won | 46 | 33 | 25 |
| Seat change | ▼8 | ▼13 | ▲25 |
| Popular vote | 310,362 | 223,015 | 165,421 |
| Percentage | 36.5% | 26.2% | 19.4% |
| Swing | ▲0.3% | ▼4.5% | New party |
| | Fourth party | Fifth party |
| Party | Greens | FDP |
| Last election | 21 seats, 13.9% | 0 seats, 3.5% |
| Seats won | 11 | 6 |
| Seat change | ▼5 (Note: Five Green MPs had previously left the party in 1999.) | ▲6 |
| Popular vote | 72,771 | 43,214 |
| Percentage | 8.6% | 5.1% |
| Swing | ▼5.3% | ▲1.6% |
Mayor before election
Ortwin Runde
SPD
Elected Mayor
Ole von Beust
CDU

The 2001 Hamburg state election was held on 23 September 2001 to elect the members of the 17th Hamburg Parliament. The incumbent coalition government of the Social Democratic Party (SPD) and Green Alternative List (GAL) led by First Mayor Ortwin Runde was defeated, ending 44 years of uninterrupted SPD rule in the city-state.

The most significant change of the election was the entry of the Party for a Rule of Law Offensive ("Schill party") led by Ronald Schill into Parliament with 19.4% of the vote and 25 seats. This can partly be attributed to the general feeling of insecurity due to the September 11 attacks less than two weeks earlier, especially since three of the terrorists involved, including ringleader Mohamed Atta, had been members of the Hamburg cell.

Five Green members of parliament left the party in 1999 in protest over the federal government's (at the time also an SPD-Green coalition) participation in the NATO bombing of Yugoslavia. They formed Rainbow – For a New Left. However, the list only received 1.7% of the vote in this election and lost all five seats.

The Free Democratic Party (FDP) also re-entered Parliament. The Christian Democratic Union (CDU) subsequently formed a coalition with the Schill party and FDP, and CDU leader Ole von Beust was elected as First Mayor.

== Parties ==
The table below lists parties represented in the 16th Hamburg Parliament.

| Name | | Ideology | Leader(s) | 1997 result | |
| Name | | Ideology | Leader(s) | Votes (%) | Seats |
|---|---|---|---|---|---|
| SPD | Social Democratic Party of Germany; Sozialdemokratische Partei Deutschlands | Social democracy | Ortwin Runde | 36.2% | 54 / 121 |
| CDU | Christian Democratic Union of Germany; Christlich Demokratische Union Deutschlands | Christian democracy | Ole von Beust | 30.7% | 46 / 121 |
| GAL | Green Alternative List; Grün-Alternative-Liste Hamburg | Green politics | | 13.9% | 21 / 121 |

== Opinion polling ==
| Polling firm | Fieldwork date | Sample size | SPD | CDU | GAL | FDP | Schill | Rainbow | Others | Lead |
|---|---|---|---|---|---|---|---|---|---|---|
| 2001 state election | 23 Sep 2001 | – | 36.5 | 26.2 | 8.6 | 5.1 | 19.4 | 1.7 | 2.5 | 10.3 |
| Forsa | 13–17 Sep 2001 | 1,041 | 36 | 28 | 11 | 5 | 14 | 3 | 3 | 8 |
| Emnid | 12 Sep 2001 | ? | 34 | 30 | 10 | 6 | 14 | – | 6 | 4 |
| Forschungsgruppe Wahlen | 8 Sep 2001 | ? | 36 | 27 | 12 | 7 | 14 | 2 | 2 | 9 |
| Infratest dimap | 3–8 Sep 2001 | ? | 35 | 28 | 9 | 5 | 16 | 2 | 5 | 7 |
| Infratest dimap | 27 Aug–2 Sep 2001 | 1,000 | 35 | 28 | 10 | 7 | 14 | 2 | 4 | 7 |
| Forsa | 22–27 Aug 2001 | 1,007 | 34 | 28 | 10 | 5 | 15 | 3 | 5 | 6 |
| Infratest dimap | 6–11 Aug 2001 | 1,000 | 35 | 30 | 10 | 7 | 12 | 1 | 5 | 5 |
| Infratest dimap | 12 Jul 2001 | ? | 35 | 29 | 11 | 8 | 10 | 1 | 5 | 6 |
| Forsa | 26 Jun–2 Jul 2001 | 1,050 | 37 | 31 | 9 | 5 | 9 | – | 9 | 6 |
| Infratest dimap | 5–10 Jun 2001 | 1,002 | 35 | 31 | 11 | 6 | 9 | – | 5 | 4 |
| Forsa | 2–7 May 2001 | 1,008 | 34 | 33 | 12 | 5 | 8 | 1 | 7 | 1 |
| Forsa | March 2001 | 1,002 | 36 | 31 | 13 | 4 | 8 | 2 | 6 | 5 |
| Psephos | 1–2 Feb 2001 | 1,007 | 36 | 32 | 13 | 3 | 9 | – | 7 | 4 |
| Infratest dimap | 27–29 Nov 2000 | 1,000 | 37 | 30 | 12 | 5 | 6 | – | 10 | 7 |
| Psephos | 24–25 May 2000 | 1,004 | 38 | 33 | 11 | 6 | 3 | – | 9 | 5 |
| Psephos | 7–9 Sep 1999 | 1,000 | 35 | 44 | 11 | 4 | – | – | 6 | 9 |
| Infratest dimap | 7–9 Sep 1999 | 1,000 | 37 | 42 | 9 | 3 | – | – | 9 | 5 |
| 1997 state election | 21 Sep 1997 | – | 36.2 | 30.7 | 13.9 | 3.5 | – | – | 15.7 | 5.5 |

== Election result ==
Summary of the 23 September 2001 election results for the Hamburg Parliament
| Party | Votes | % | +/- | Seats | +/- | Seats % |
|---|---|---|---|---|---|---|
| Social Democratic Party (SPD) | 310,362 | 36.5 | ▲0.3 | 46 | ▼8 | 38.0 |
| Christian Democratic Union (CDU) | 223,015 | 26.2 | ▼4.5 | 33 | ▼13 | 27.3 |
| Party for a Rule of Law Offensive (Schill) | 165,421 | 19.4 | New | 25 | New | 20.7 |
| Green Alternative List (GAL) | 72,771 | 8.6 | ▼5.3 | 11 | ▼5 | 9.1 |
| Free Democratic Party (FDP) | 43,214 | 5.1 | ▲1.6 | 6 | ▲6 | 5.0 |
| Rainbow – For a new left (REGENBOGEN) | 14,247 | 1.7 | New | 0 | ▼5 | 0 |
| Others | 21,638 | 2.5 | | 0 | ±0 | 0 |
| Total | 850,668 | 100.0 | | 121 | ±0 | |
| Voter turnout | | 71.1 | ▲2.4 | | | |

Popular Vote
| SPD | 36.48% |
| CDU | 26.22% |
| SCHILL | 19.45% |
| GAL | 8.55% |
| FDP | 5.08% |
| Other | 4.22% |

Bürgerschaft seats
| SPD | 38.02% |
| CDU | 27.27% |
| SCHILL | 20.66% |
| GAL | 9.09% |
| FDP | 4.96% |

== See also ==
- Hamburg state elections in the Weimar Republic

== Sources ==
- The Federal Returning Officer
