= List of parks and gardens in Hamburg =

List of parks and gardens in the German city of Hamburg.

Hamburg is one of Europe's greenest metropolises, with parks and gardens alone making up eight percent of the city's land area, in addition to even larger percentages for nature reserves and agricultural land areas. In 2011, the city was voted "European Green Capital", in 2013 Hamburg hosted the International Garden Show (IGS) on the island of Wilhelmsburg.

== Lists ==
=== Public parks ===
List of public urban parks in Hamburg. The list does not include protected areas such as forests or nature reserves, nor Hamburg's many park-like cemeteries.

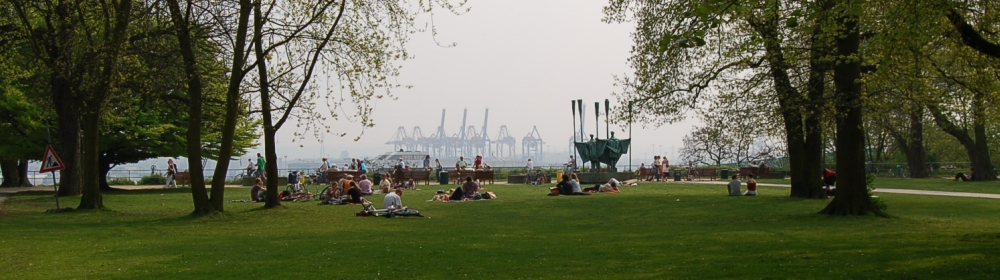
Altona Balkon, overlooking Hamburg Harbour at a height of 27 m (89 ft) above the Elbe

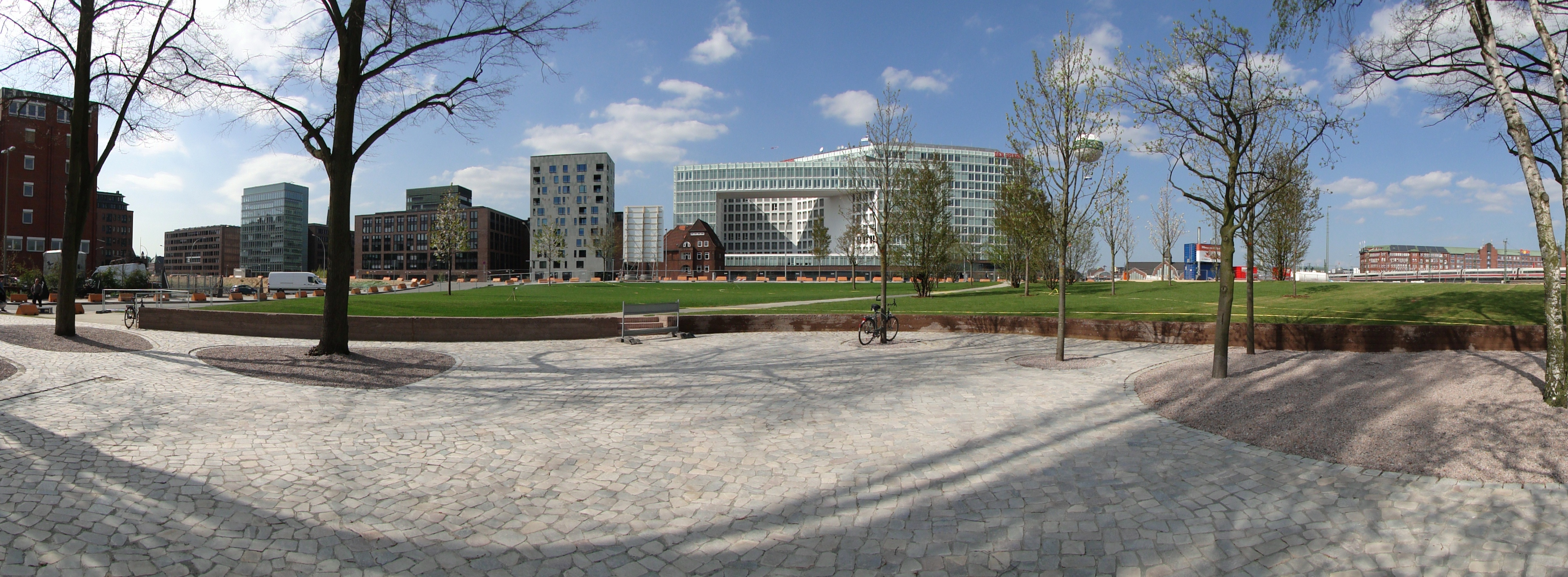
Lohsepark, one of the new inner city urban parks developed within the new HafenCity district

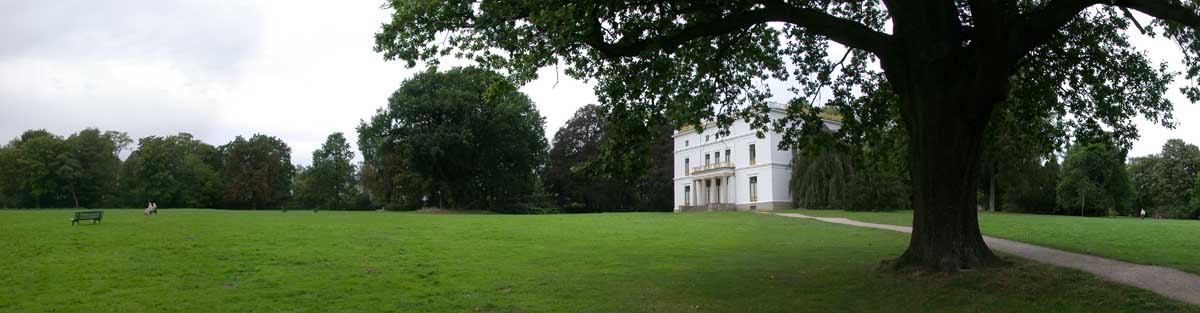
Jenisch Park, one of Hamburg's many 18th-century English landscape parks along Elbchaussee

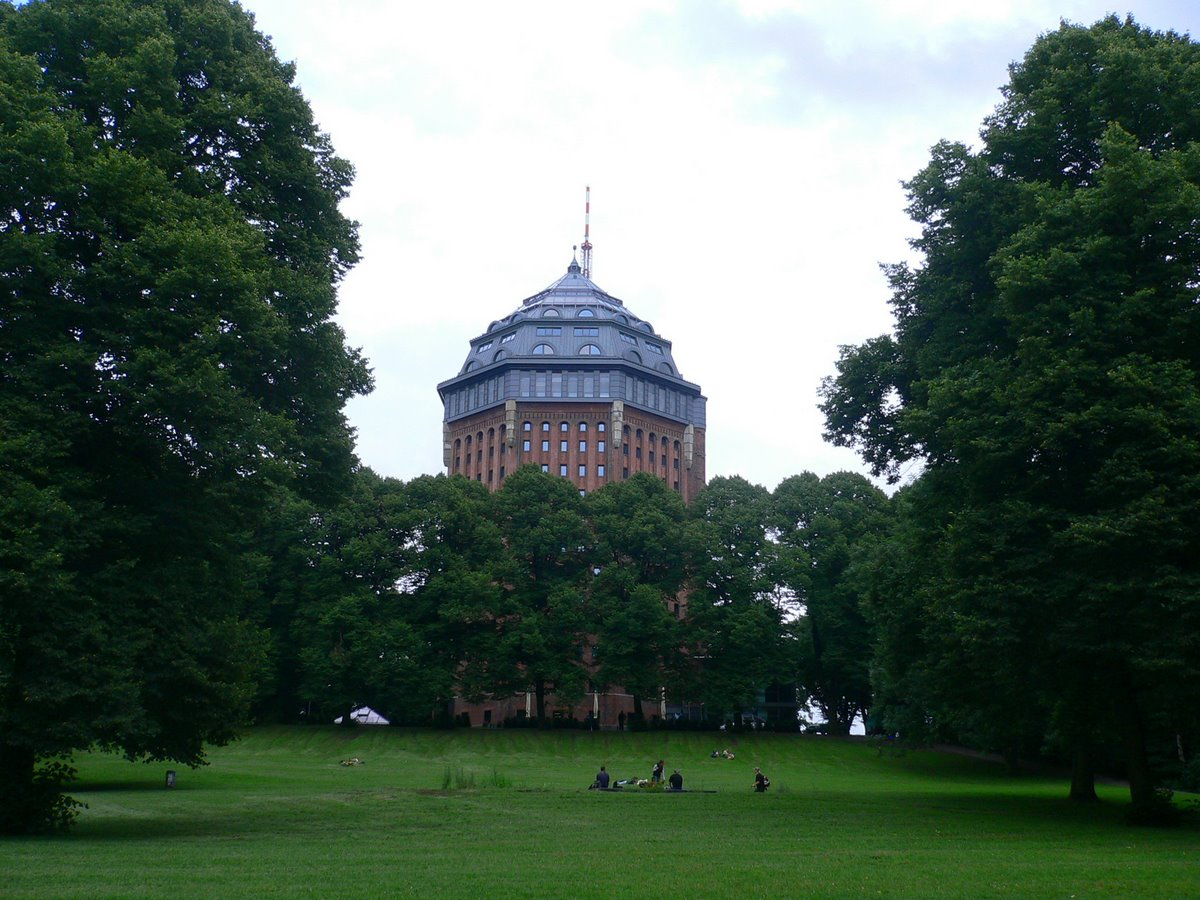
Sternschanzenpark, with the iconic Schanzenturm (de)

Name	Area	Est. (Note: Creation or opening date. If two dates are given the first date is for a preceding park or garden.)	Location (Note: Hamburg district.)	notes
Alster Park (Note: The area given for Alsterpark includes the Außenalster's water surface area; the land area alone is somewhat around 5.0 ha.)	169.0 ha	1680 (1952)	several districts	The Alstervorland on the lake's western shore
Alter Elbpark	4.2 ha	1869	Neustadt	
Altona Balkon ("Balcony")	5.4 ha	1638 (1952)	Altona-Altstadt	
Altona Volkspark	205.0 ha	1918	Bahrenfeld	
Amsinckpark	5.7 ha	1868 (1956)	Lokstedt	
Antonipark (Park Fiction)	0.8 ha	2002	St. Pauli	
Astronomiepark		1912	Bergedorf	
BallinPark	3.1 ha	2007	Veddel	
Baur's Park	8.7 ha	1810 (1927)	Blankenese	designed by French landscape architect Joseph-Jacques Ramée Baur's Park in 1810
Bergedorf Rathauspark	1.5 ha		Bergedorf	
Bergedorf Schlosspark	5.0 ha	1805 (1896)	Bergedorf	
Berner Gutspark	7.2 ha	1880	Farmsen-Berne	
Blohm's Park	4.0 ha	1875 (1934)	Horn	
Bolívarpark	1.1 ha		Harvestehude	
City-Nord-Park	13.8 ha	1965	Winterhude	
Donner's Park	4.3 ha	1676 (1984)	Ottensen	
Domplatz	0.5 ha	2009	Altstadt	
Eichtalpark	8.5 ha	1830 (1926)	Wandsbek	
Eimsbüttel Park	1.9 ha	1875	Eimsbüttel	
Eppendorfer Park	8.0 ha	1890	Eppendorf	
Gorch-Fock-Park	2.6 ha		Finkenwerder	
Große Wallanlagen		1869	Neustadt	
Gustav-Mahler-Park		1869	Rotherbaum	
Goßler's Park	8.4 ha	1795 (1924)	Blankenese	
Hamburg Stadtpark	148.0 ha	1914	Winterhude	
Hammer Park	15.9 ha	1773 (1914)	Hamm	
Harburg Schlosspark	1.5 ha	2013	Harburg	
Harburg Stadtpark	90.0 ha	1913 (1926)	Harburg	
Hans-Christian-Andersen-Park	14.7 ha	2009	Osdorf	
Hayn's Park	4.8 ha	1873 (1931)	Eppendorf	
Heine Park	3.4 ha	1790 (1984)	Ottensen	
Henneberg Park	3.2 ha	1855 (1930)	Poppenbüttel	
Hesse Park	3.8 ha	1799 (1926)	Blankenese	
Hindenburg-Park		1827 (1927)	Othmarschen	
Hirschpark	24.5 ha	1620 (1927)	Blankenese	
Horner Park	6.0 ha	1909	Horn	
Innocentiapark	4.5 ha	1884	Harvestehude	
Jacobi Park	6.0 ha	1954	Eilbek	
Jenfeld Moorpark	5.0 ha	2003	Jenfeld	
Jenisch Park	42.0 ha	1785 (1927)	Othmarschen	
Kellinghusenpark	2.3 ha	1842 (1929)	Eppendorf	
Kleine Wallanlagen		1869	Neustadt	
Lindenpark	2.0 ha	2003	Eimsbüttel	
Lise-Meitner-Park	14.3 ha	1975	Bahrenfeld	
Lohbekpark			Lokstedt	
Lohsepark	4.2 ha	2018	HafenCity	
Luna Park			Altona-Nord	
Lutherpark	8.4 ha	2003	Bahrenfeld	
Moorweide	4.3 ha		Rotherbaum	Reclining Figure by Henry Moore (1979)
Neuer Elbpark Entenwerder	16.0 ha	1997	Rothenburgsort	
Ohlendorff's Park	1.7 ha	1878 (1928)	Volksdorf	
Öjendorfer Park	140.0 ha	1968	Billstedt	
Planten un Blomen	47.0 ha	1821	Neustadt	
Rüschpark	21.0 ha	1996	Finkenwerder	
Saseler Park	2.1 ha	1830 (1962)	Sasel	
Schinckel's Park	7.0 ha	1850 (1937)	Blankenese	
Schleidenpark	1.3 ha	1904	Barmbek-Süd	
Schwarzenbergpark	16.0 ha	1904	Heimfeld	
Seelemannpark	0.7 ha		Eppendorf	
Sternschanzenpark	12.0 ha	1866	Sternschanze	
Sven-Simon-Park	5.4 ha	1952 (1980)	Blankenese	
Thörl's Park	5.0 ha		Hamm	
Von-Eicken-Park	2.3 ha	1819 (1899)	Lokstedt	
Wacholderpark	1.0 ha	1910	Fuhlsbüttel	
Wehber's Park	2.0 ha	1852 (1926)	Eimsbüttel	
Wilhelmsburg Inselpark	100.0 ha	2013	Wilhelmsburg	

Legend: Alster park Elbe park Wallanlagen park

Photo impressions of Hamburg parks:

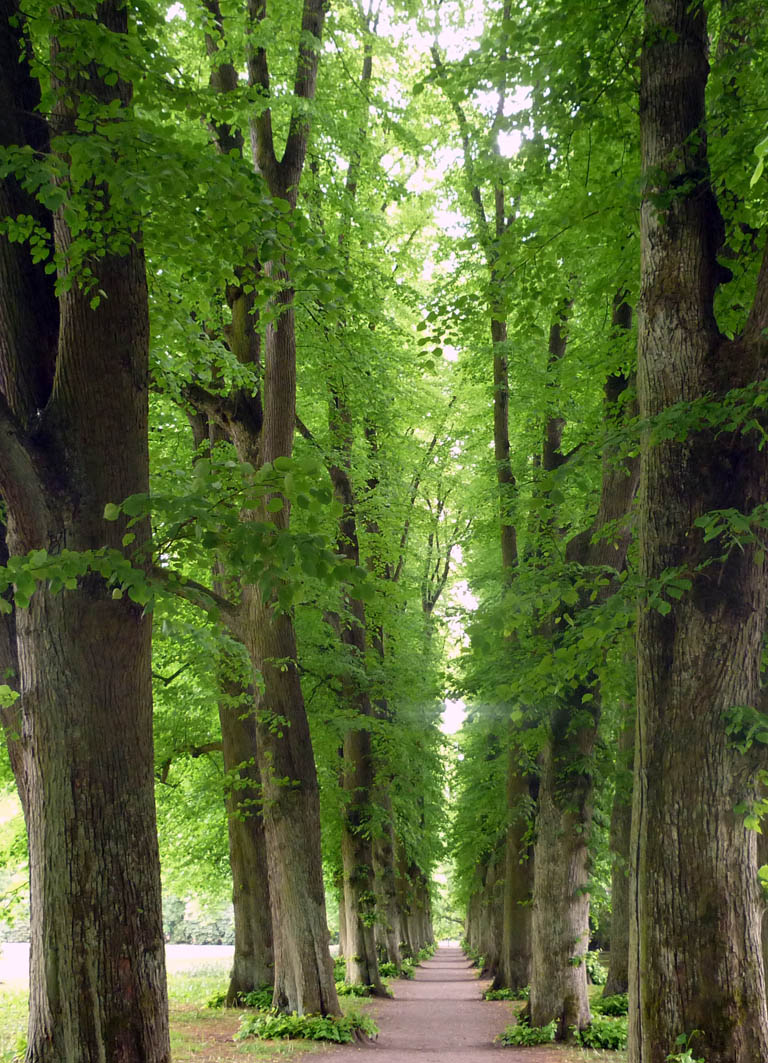
Hirschpark

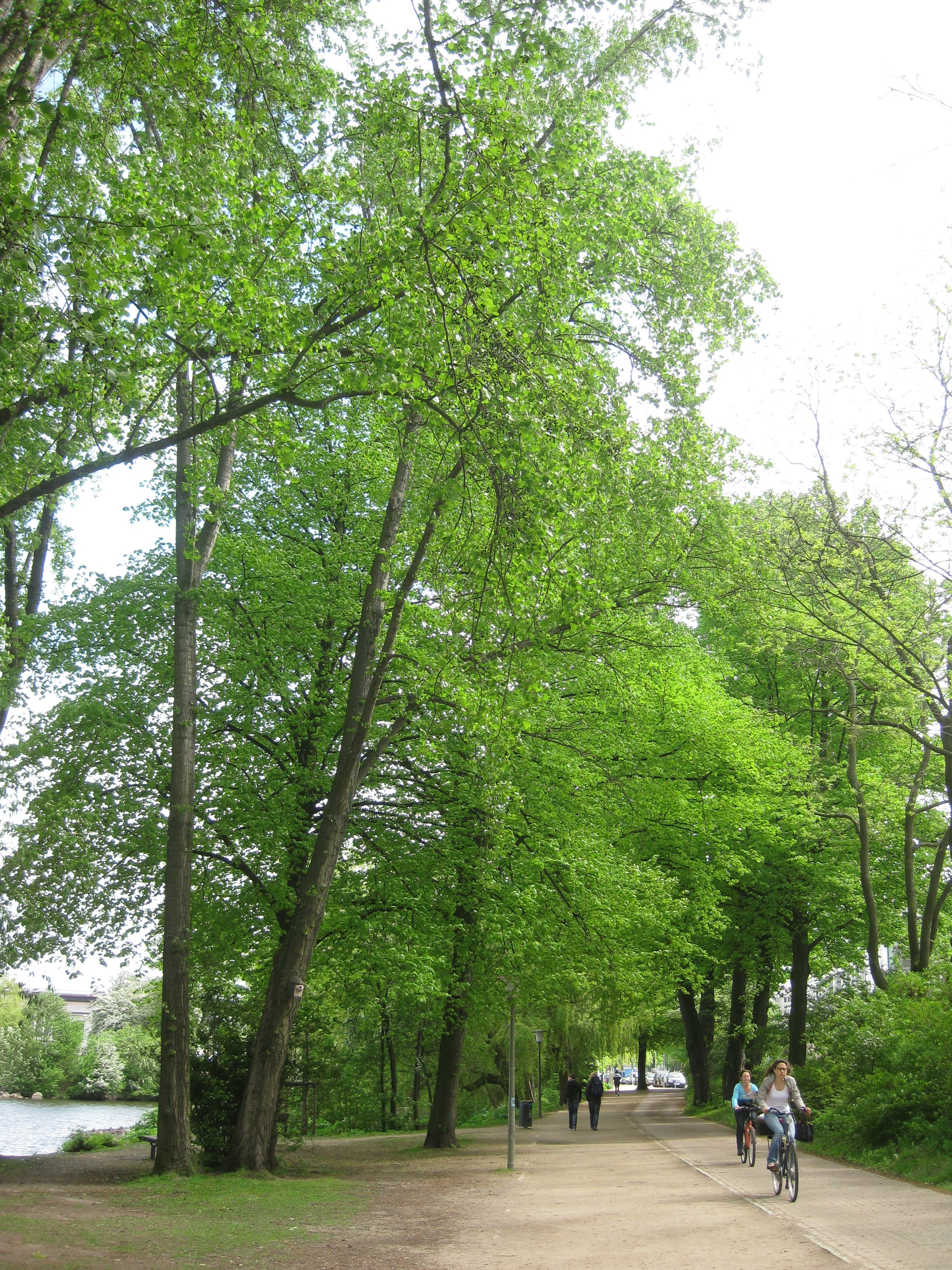
Alsterpark

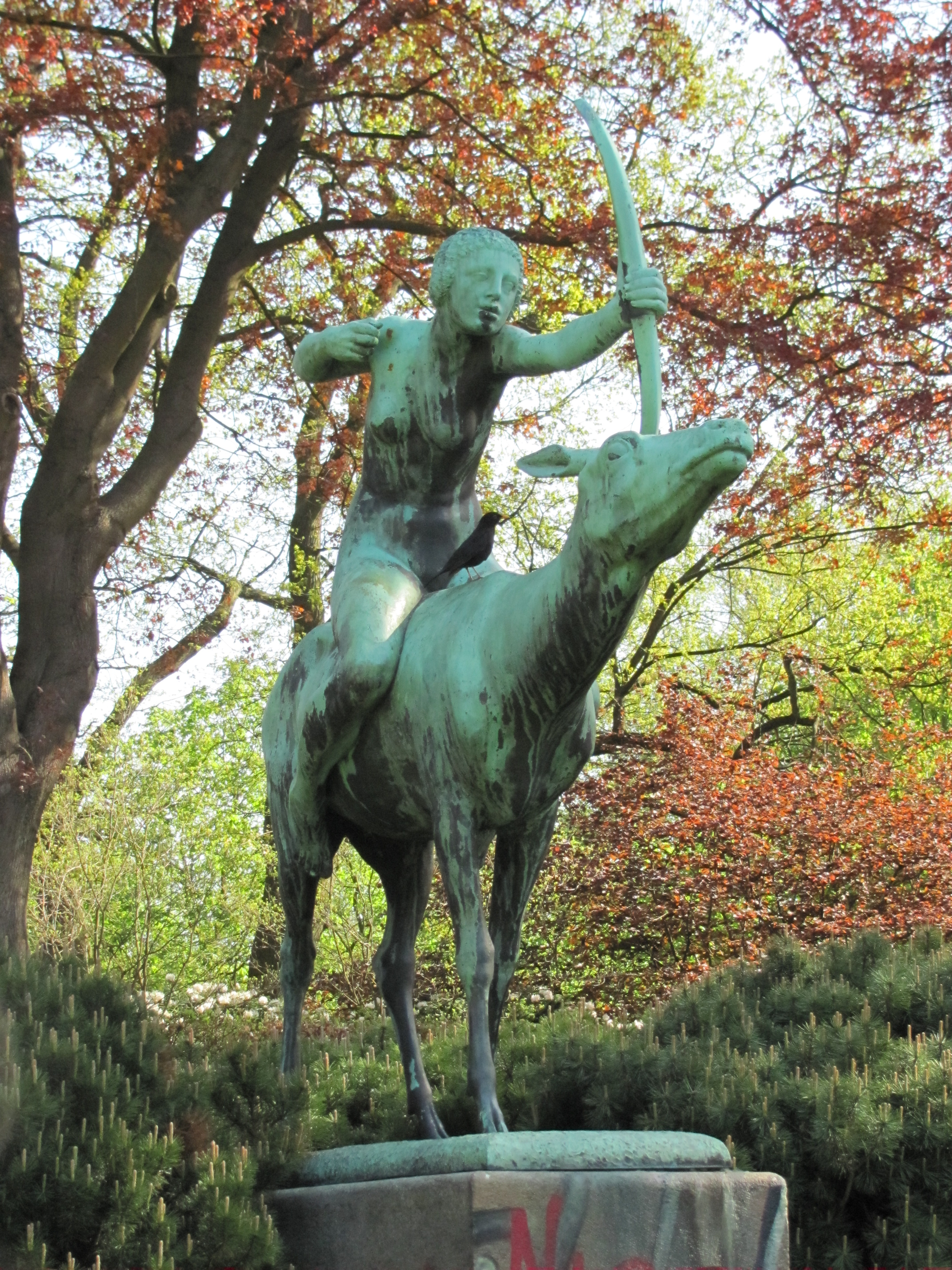
Stadtpark

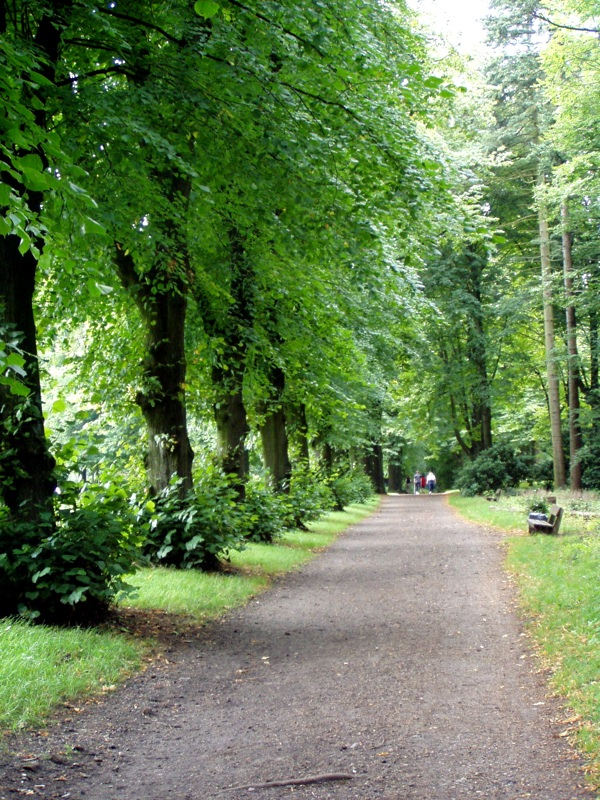
Volkspark

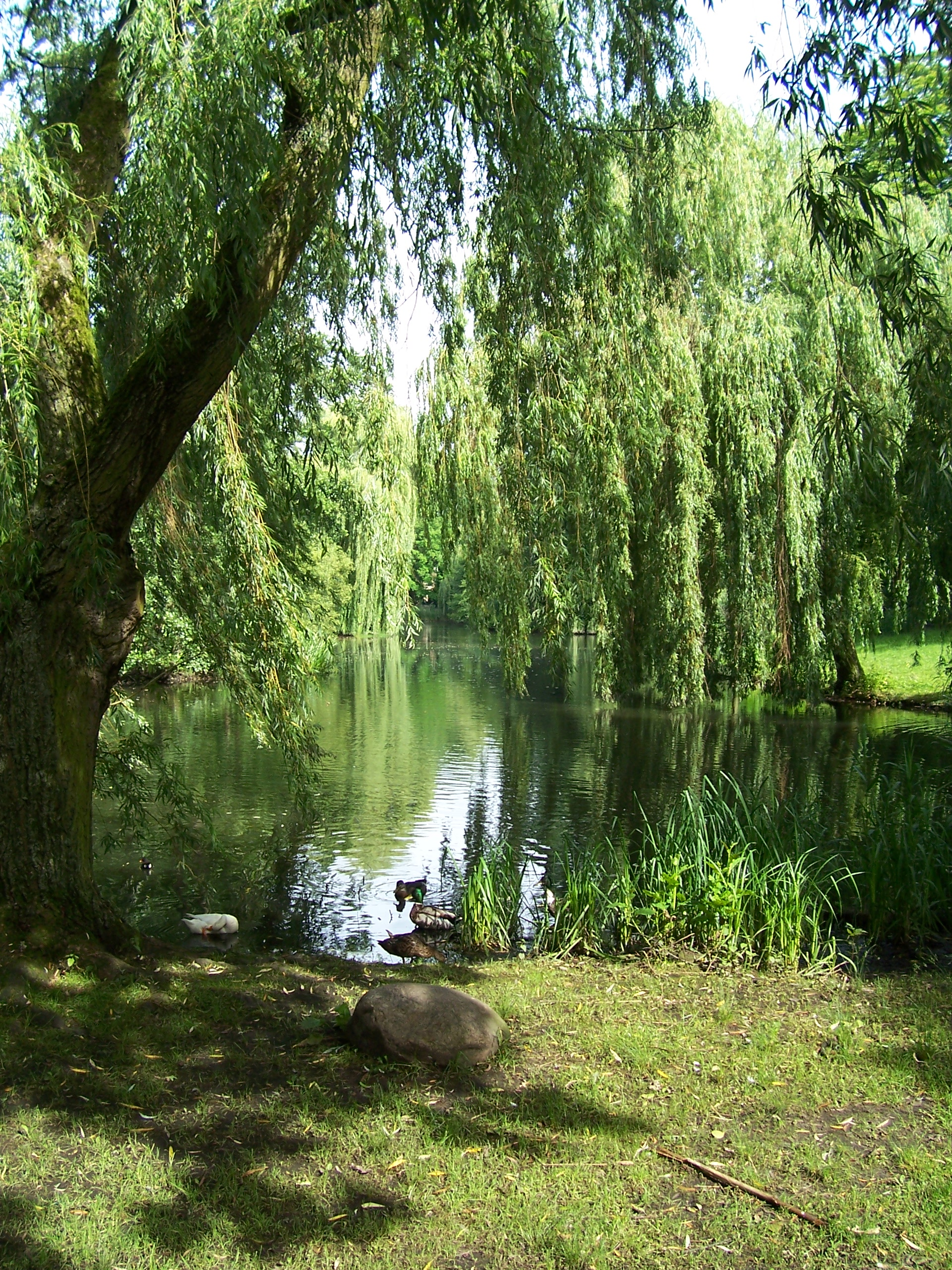
Eimsbüttel Park

=== Public gardens ===
List of public gardens in Hamburg. In some cases, a strict distinction between park or garden may be difficult.

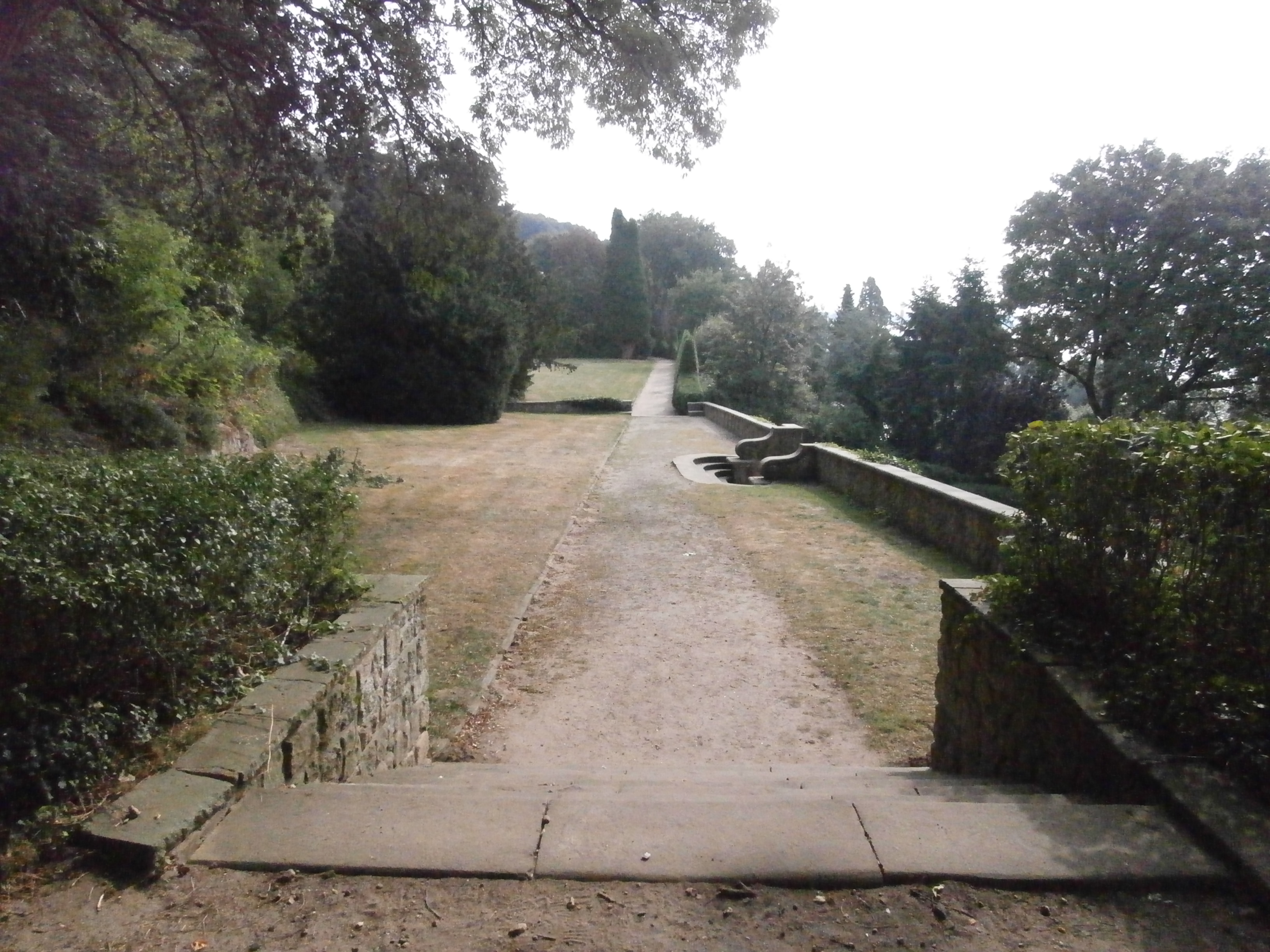
Italianized Römischer Garten

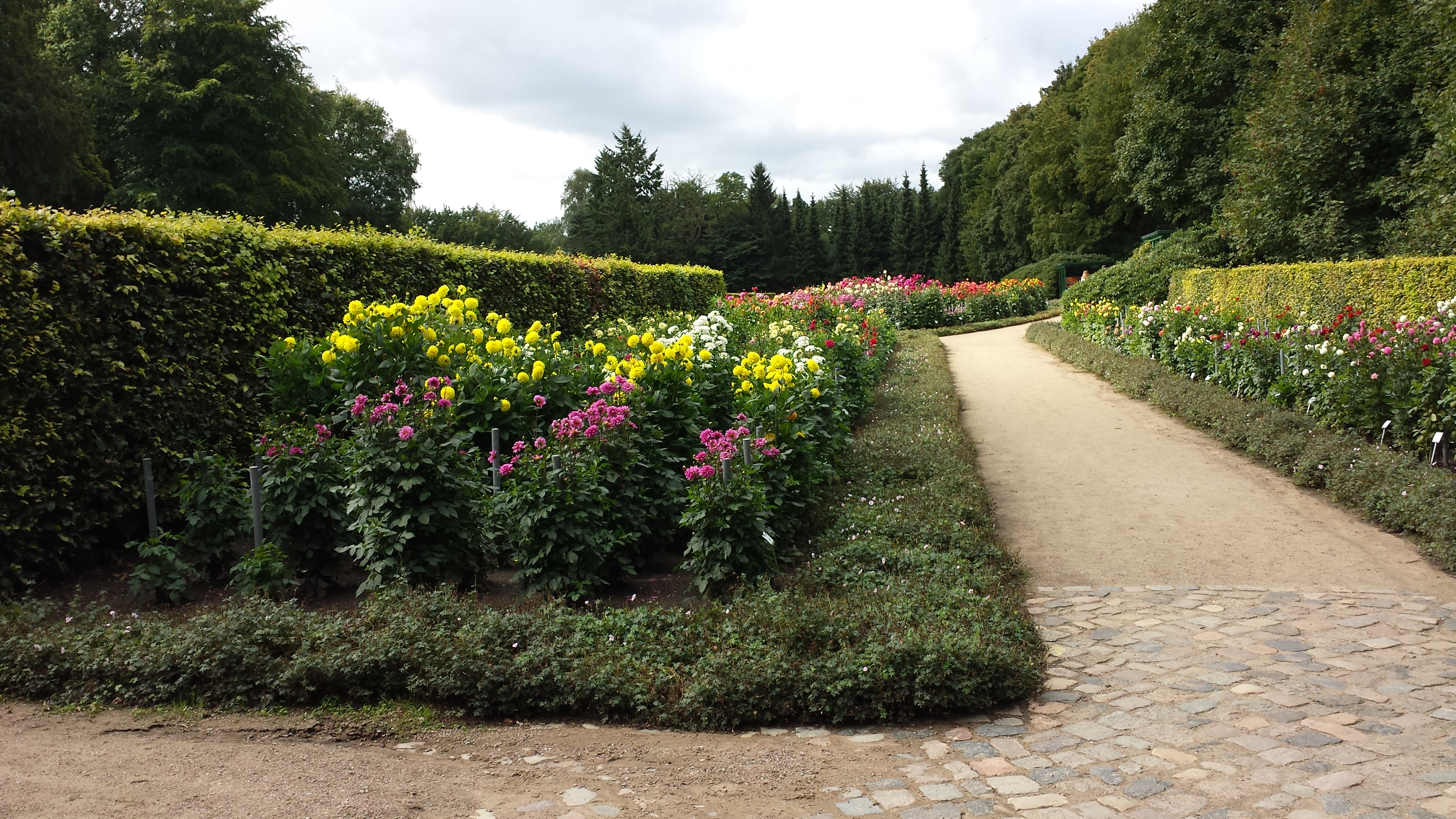
Altona Dahliengarten

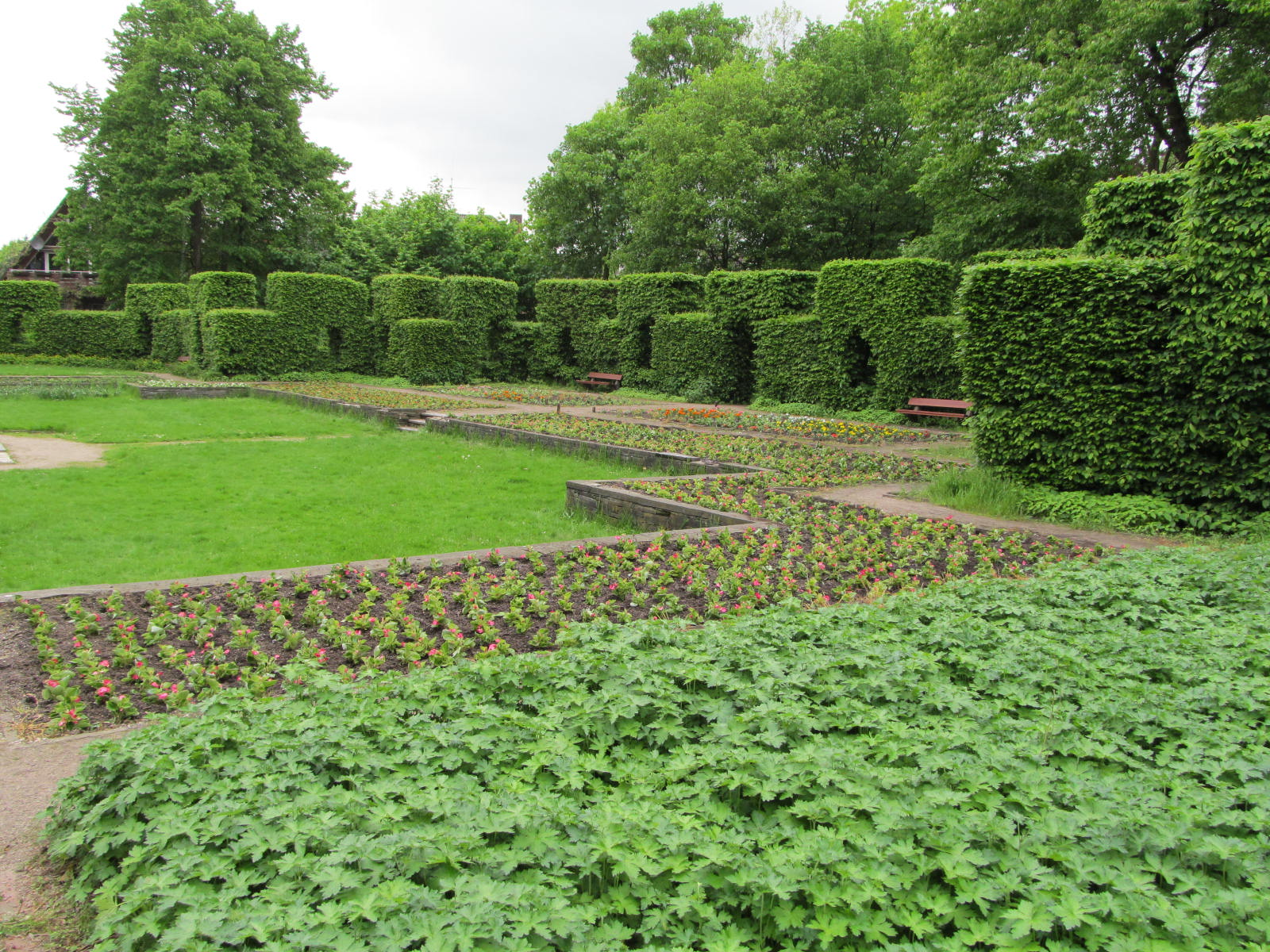
Hammer Park's Topiary Garden

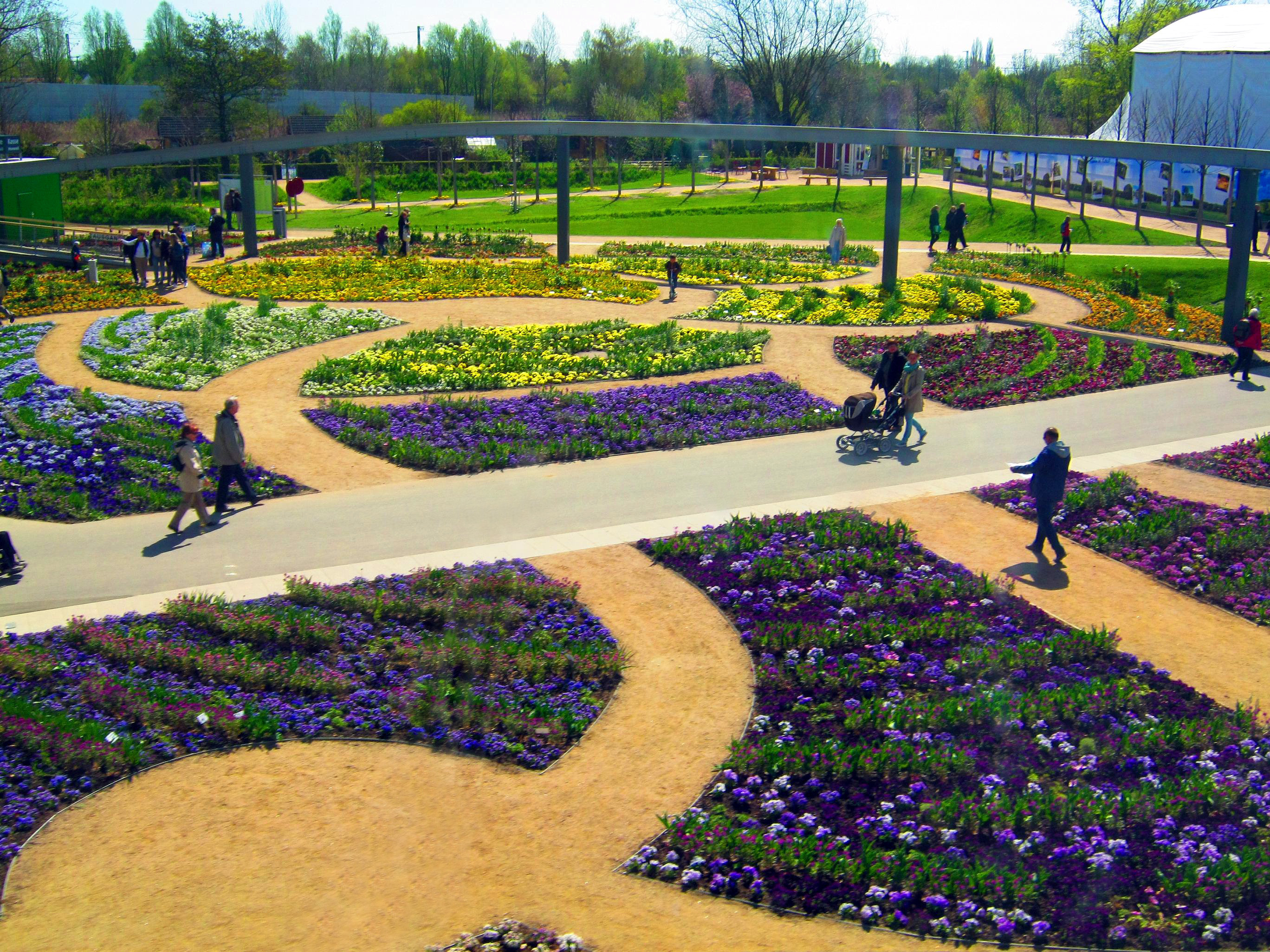
Wilhelmsburg Inselpark

name	area	est.	location	notes
Altona Dahliengarten	1.5 ha	1920	Bahrenfeld	Europe's oldest dahlia garden, features ca. 850 dahlia species
Altona Rosengarten	4.5 ha	1793 (1890)	Ottensen	
Apothekergarten			Neustadt	
Arboretum Lohbrügge	10.0 ha	1965	Lohbrügge	
Botanical Garden (Old)		1821	Neustadt	
Botanical Garden (New)	24.0 ha	1979	Osdorf	Loki-Schmidt-Garten since 2012
Botanischer Sondergarten	5.5 ha	1926 (1956)	Wandsbek	
Garten de l'Aigle	0.8 ha	1888	Eppendorf	
Hamm Kräutergarten		1986	Hamm	
Hamm Rosengarten		1957	Hamm	
Harburg Schulgarten	8.5 ha	1931	Harburg	
Japanischer Garten		1988	Neustadt	Europe's largest garden of its kind, designed by Japanese landscape architect Yoshikuni Araki The tea house
Planten un Blomen (Note: The area given for Planten un Blomen includes Alter Botanischer Garten, Japanischer Garten and Rosengarten.)	47.0 ha	1821	Neustadt	
Römischer Garten	0.7 ha	1890 (1951)	Blankenese	
Rosa-Luxemburg-Garten		1926	Eimsbüttel	
Rosengarten	0.5 ha	1993	Neustadt	features ca. 300 rose species
Volksdorf Bauerngarten		1969	Volksdorf	part of Volksdorf open-air museum
Wilhelmsburg Rosenboulevard	0.3 ha	2013	Wilhelmsburg	

Legend: Alster park resp. garden Elbe park resp. garden Wallanlagen park resp. garden

Photo impressions of Hamburg gardens:

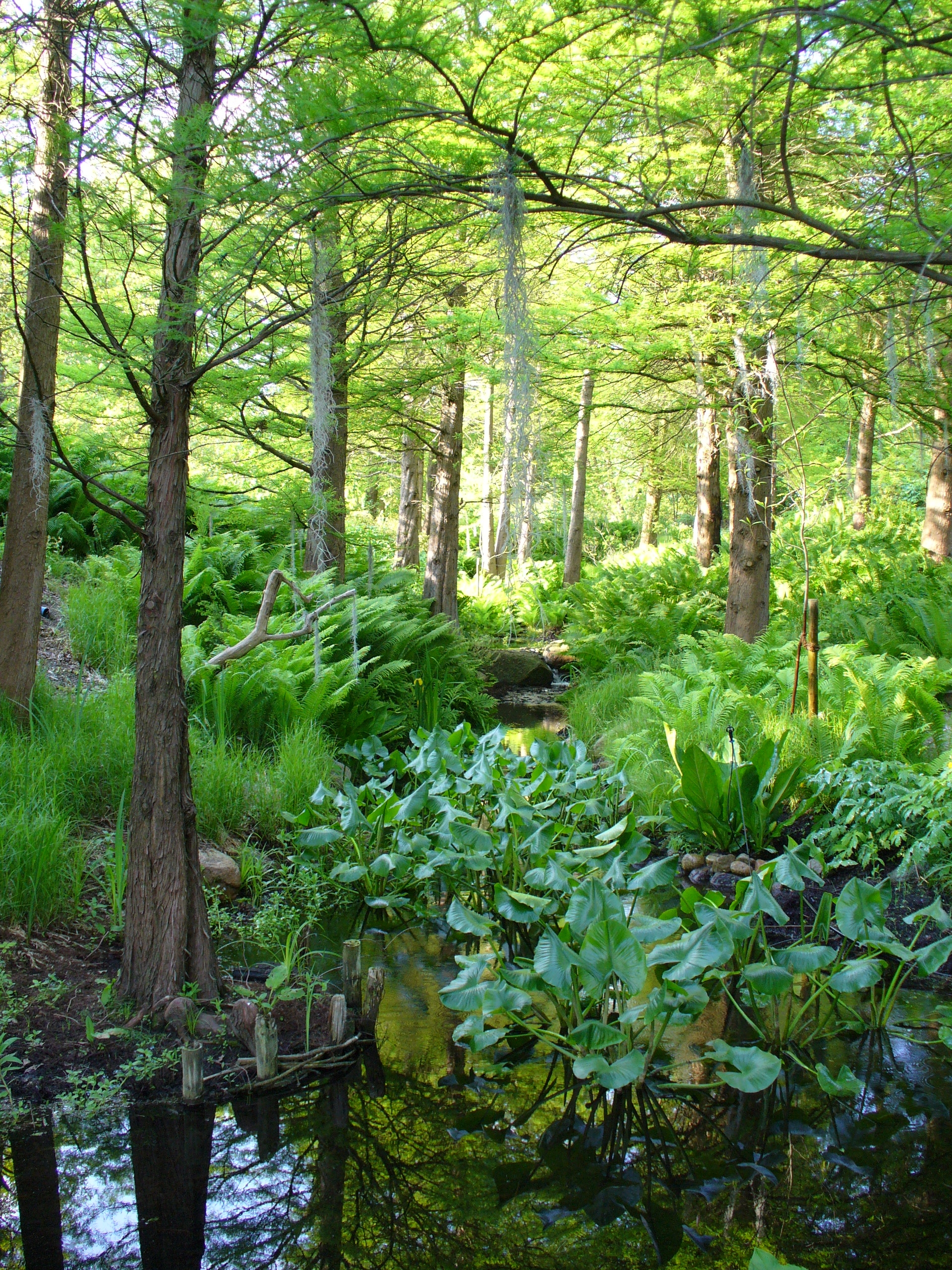
Loki-Schmidt-Garten

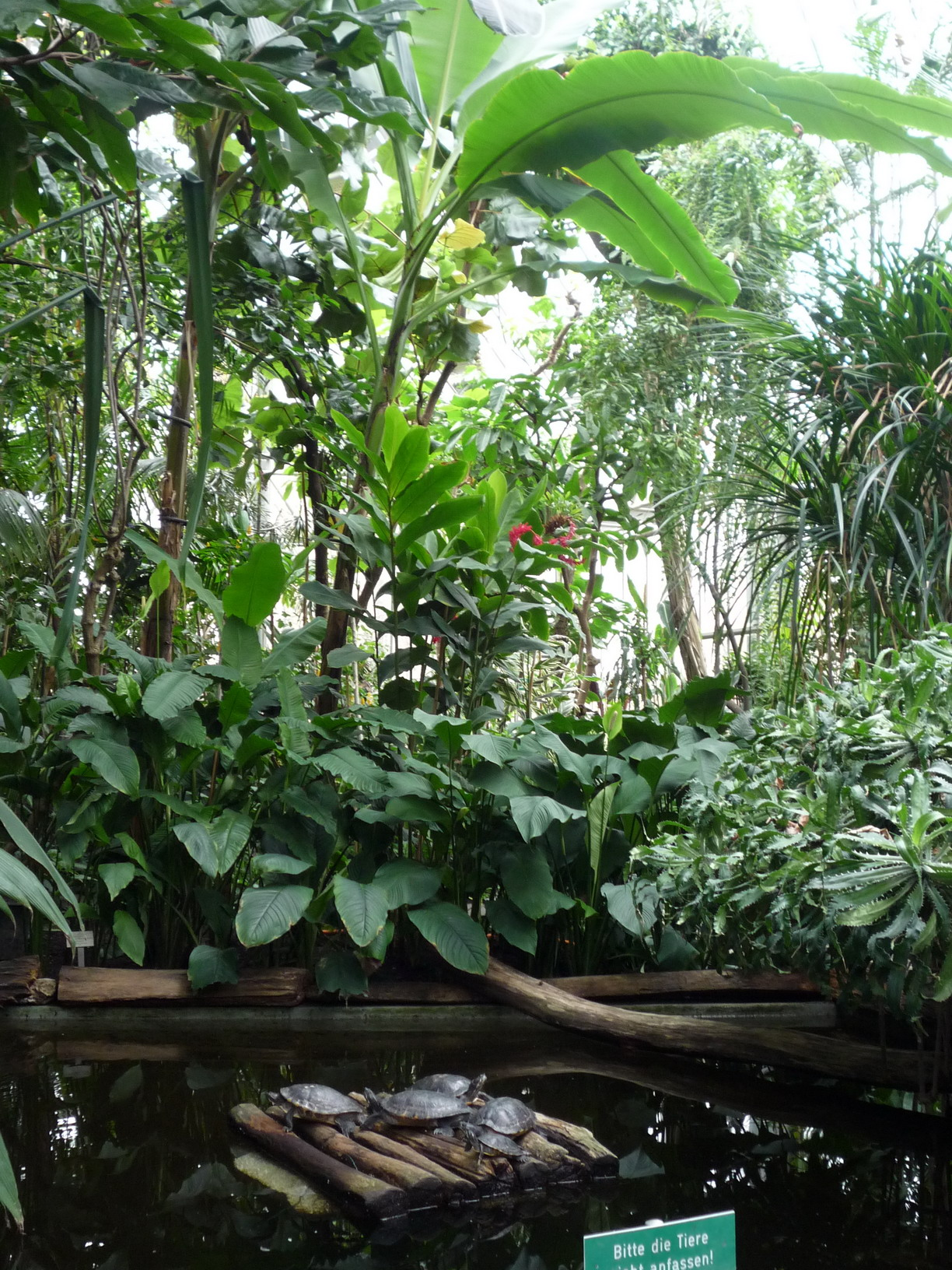
Planten un Blomen

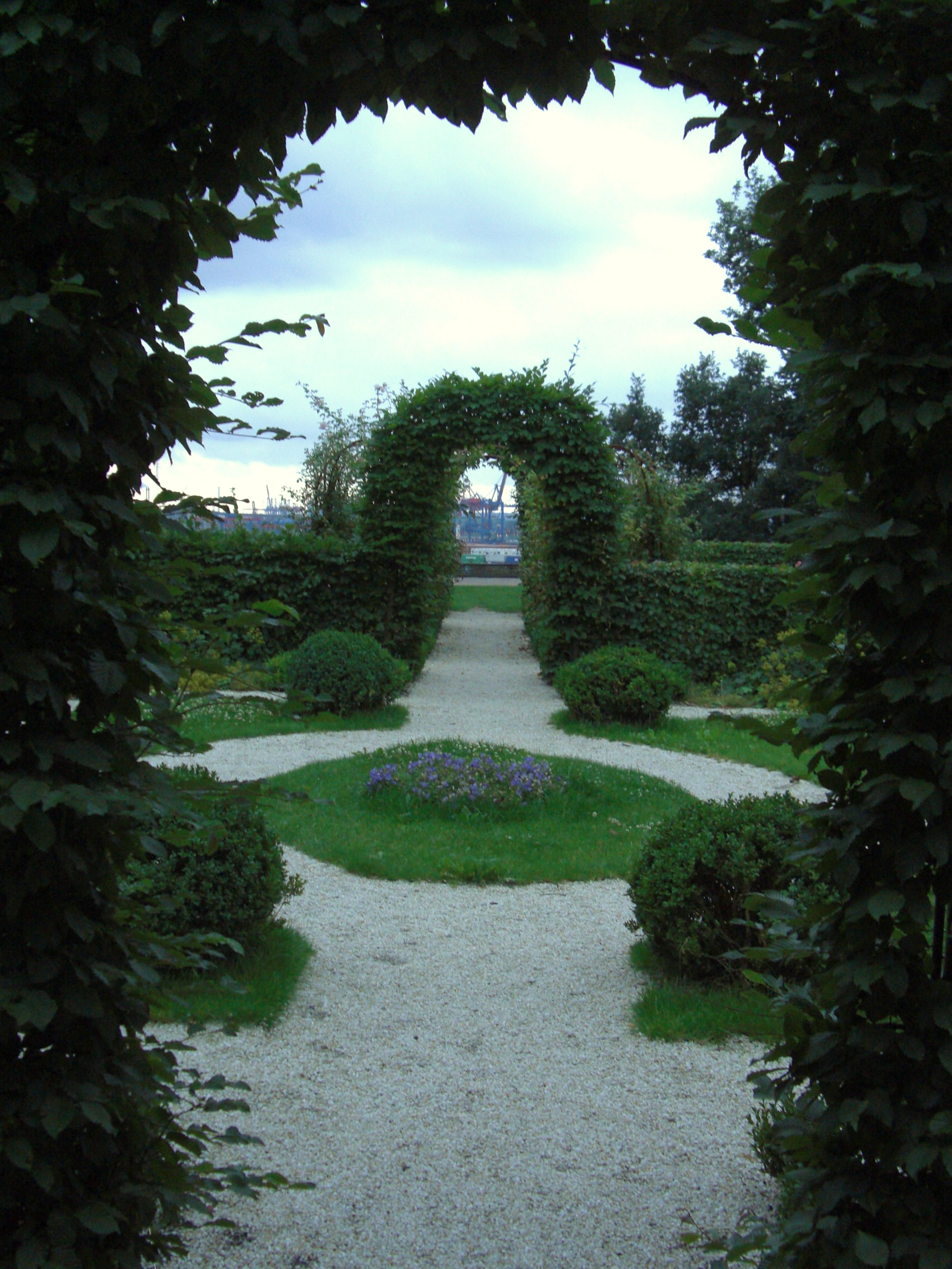
Altona Rosengarten

== See also ==
- List of nature parks in Germany
- List of botanical gardens in Germany
