= Barclays Arena =

Multipurpose indoor arena in Hamburg, Germany

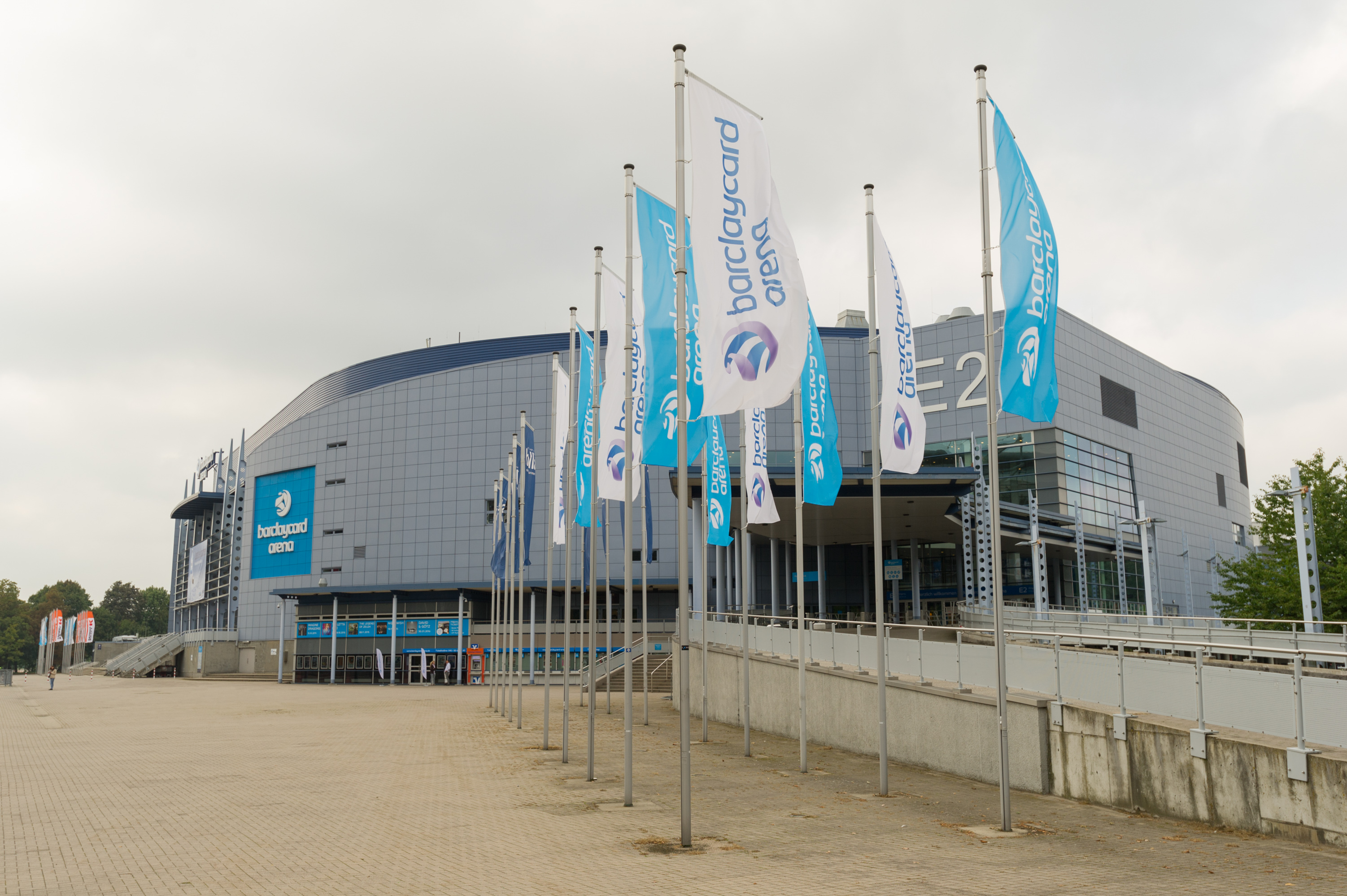
- Interactive map of Barclays Arena
- Former names: Color Line Arena (2002–2010); O_{2} World Hamburg (2010–2015); Barclaycard arena (2015–2021)
- Location: Sylvesterallee 10; 22525 Altona, Hamburg; Germany
- Coordinates: 53°35′21″N 9°53′57″E
- Owner: Anschutz Entertainment Group
- Capacity: 16,000
- Public transit: Stellingen

Construction
- Groundbreaking: 13 June 2001
- Opened: 8 November 2002
- Cost: € 83 million

Tenants
- Hamburg Freezers (DEL) (2002–2016); HSV Hamburg (HBL) (2002–2016); Hamburg Towers (BBL) (since 2024, selected games)

Website
- Official website

Barclays Arena (originally known as the Color Line Arena and formerly known as barclaycard arena and O_{2} World Hamburg and will soon be renamed Sparda-Bank Arena) is a multipurpose arena in Hamburg, Germany. It opened in 2002 and can hold up to 16,000 people (13,800 or 12,947 for sporting events). It is located at Altona Volkspark, adjacent to the football stadium Volksparkstadion and the Volksbank Arena in Hamburg's western Bahrenfeld district.

The arena is primarily used for pop/rock concerts and was the home of handball club HSV Hamburg and ice hockey team Hamburg Freezers until both teams folded in 2016.

== History ==
The arena opened in November 2002, is 150 meters long, 110 meters wide, and has an elevation of 33 meters. Construction costs totaled approximately €83 million (ca. US$121.5 million). The construction was funded by the Finnish entrepreneur Harry Harkimo and the city of Hamburg, who sold Harkimo the land for a symbolic price of one Mark and also financed infrastructure improvements with 12 million Marks (about €6.1 million) as a preparatory measure. In October 2007 the arena was sold to Anschutz Entertainment Group for an estimated €75 million. Anschutz Entertainment Group is a subsidiary of the Anschutz Corporation, one of the world's leading sports and entertainment presenters.

=== Naming rights ===
Logo of the arena during O2 sponsoring

The arena was initially named after Norwegian ferry operator Color Line as the "Color Line Arena". In 2010 the sponsor changed to Spanish telecommunications company Telefónica, naming the arena as "O_{2} World Hamburg". O_{2} sponsorship ceased in summer 2015, changing the arena name again, this time into Barclaycard Arena (stylized as "barclaycard arena").

In June 2021, because of Barclaycard's rebranding in Germany to the bank's corporate name, the arena announced that from autumn 2021 onwards, the name will change once more to Barclays Arena (stylized as BARCLAYS Arena). In June 2026, it was announced that the arena would be renamed to Sparda-Bank Arena starting 21 July 2027 after Sparda-Bank Hamburg bought the naming rights following Barclays ceasing operations in Germany.

== Notable events ==
Arena hosted Dota 2 annual world championship "The International" in September 2025.

== See also ==
- List of indoor arenas in Germany
- List of European ice hockey arenas
