= Bahrenfelder SV =

German football club

- Full name: Bahrenfelder Sportverein von 1919 e.V.
- Nickname: BSV 19
- Founded: 1919
- Ground: Sportpark Bahrenfeld ehemals Hermann-Seyffarth-Platz
- Capacity: 2,000
- League: Kreisliga 7 Hamburg (VIII)
- 2015–16: 16th (withdrawn)
Home colours	Away colours

Bahrenfelder SV is a German association football club from Bahrenfeld in the western quarter of the city of Hamburg.

== History ==
The team was established on 17 February 1919 and as a workers' club played as part of the Arbeiter-Turn- und Sportbund (ATSB or Workers' Gymnastics and Sports Federation), a national sports organization active between 1893 and 1933.

SV made two appearances in the league playoff. They got as far as the quarterfinals in 1923–24 where they were eliminated by FT Gerresheim. In 1929–30 the team soundly beat ATV Steinach 7:1 to advance to the final where they lost to TSV Nürnberg Ost 6:1.

Following the rise to power of the Nazis the Bahrenfelder side was banned in 1933 along with other workers' clubs and clubs with religious affiliations as being politically undesirable. Following World War II the club was reestablished on 15 December 1945.

In addition to football the current day club has departments for angling, boxing, cycling, fitness, gymnastics, Ju Jitsu, running, table tennis, and volleyball.

Nowadays the club's football department fluctuates between the tier seven Bezirksliga and the Kreisliga, playing in the latter again since 2014.

== Honours ==
The club's honours:

- Hamburg champions: 1921
- Northern German champions:1924
