= Arboretum Lohbrügge =

Arboretum with greenhouses in Hamburg, Germany

Coordinates: 53.5051°N 10.1996°E

The Arboretum Lohbrügge (10 hectares), also known as the Arboretum der Bundesforschungsanstalt für Forst- und Holzwirtschaft or the Arboretum Lohbruegge der Bundesanstalt, is an arboretum with greenhouses maintained by the German Federal Research Center for Forestry and Forest Products (BFH). It is located at Leuschnerstrasse 91, Lohbrügge, Hamburg, Germany, and open by appointment.

The arboretum was established in 1965 by the BFH, Bundesforschungsanstalt für Forst- und Holzwirtschaft. According to Hamann and Seehann, as of 1983 it contained 1541 plant taxa in the arboretum and greenhouse; more recent figures increase that figure to 1570 taxa representing 126 families from all continents, including Taxodium distichum (about 70 years old) and Pinus longaeva.

Its greenhouses (about 700 m^{2}, 14 meters in height) contain about 500 tropical tree species from three climates: tropical, subtropical, and Mediterranean. They include notable specimens of Carapa guianensis, Cedrela odorata, Dalbergia latifolia, Entandrophragma utile, E. cylindricum, Khaya ivorensis, mahogany species, Swietenia macrophylla.

The arboretum also contains a herbarium (3,200 specimens) and a wood collection of 24,000 samples.

== See also ==
- List of botanical gardens in Germany
