= Volksparkstadion =

Stadium in Hamburg, Germany

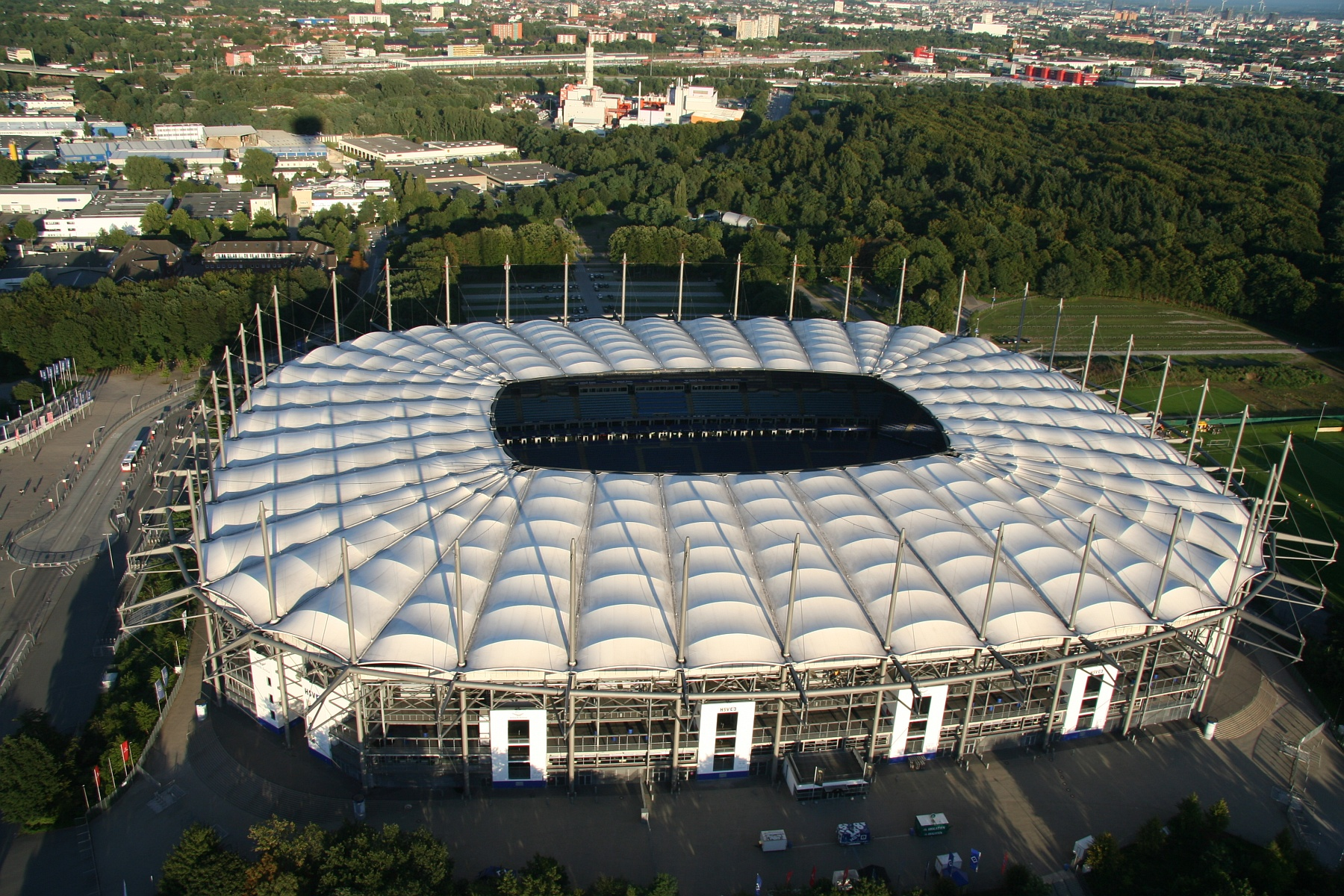
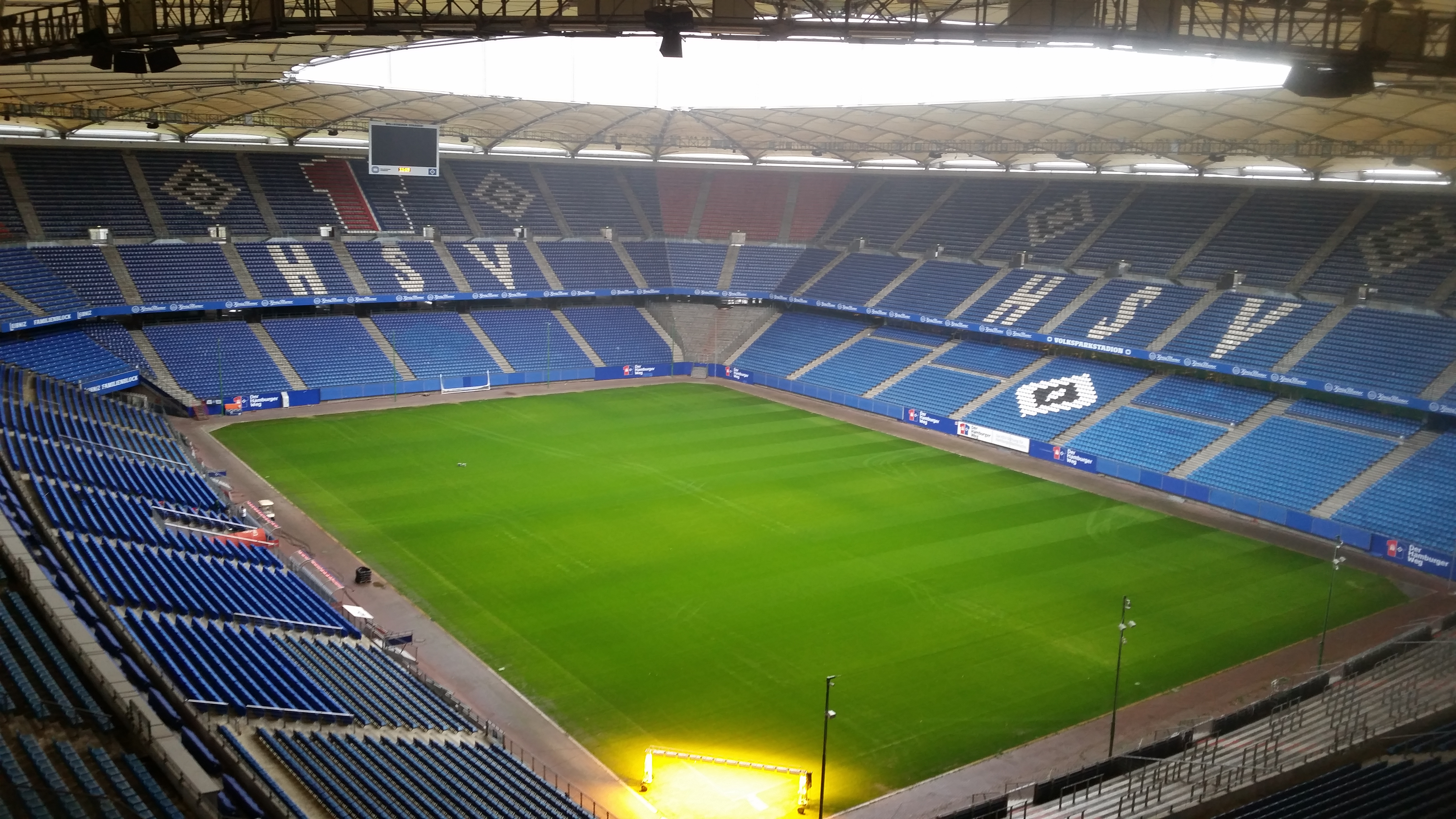
- UEFA
- Interactive map of Volksparkstadion
- Former names: AOL Arena (2001–2007); HSH Nordbank Arena (2007–2010); Imtech Arena (2010–2015)
- Location: Uwe-Seeler-Allee 9, Bahrenfeld; 22525 Hamburg, Germany
- Coordinates: 53°35′14″N 9°53′55″E
- Capacity: 57,000 (league matches); 51,500 (international matches)
- Surface: grass
- Field size: 105 × 68 m
- Public transit: Stellingen

Construction
- Built: 1951–1953
- Opened: 12 July 1953
- Renovated: 1998, 2022–present
- Cost: € 90–100 million (1998 renovation)

Tenants
- Hamburger SV (1953–present); Shakhtar Donetsk (2023–2024); Dynamo Kyiv (2024–2025); Germany national football team (selected matches)

Website
- hsv.de/en/volksparkstadion

Volksparkstadion (German pronunciation: [ˈfɔlkspaʁkˌʃtaːdi̯ɔn]) is a football stadium in Hamburg, Germany. With a capacity of 57,000, it is the eighth largest stadium in Germany. It has served as the home ground of Bundesliga side Hamburger SV since 1953.

The Volksparkstadion has additionally served as the home ground for FC Shakhtar Donetsk in continental competition during the Russian invasion of Ukraine, and as a stadium for the Germany national football team. Recently, it has served as a host stadium for both the 2006 FIFA World Cup and UEFA Euro 2024.

== History ==
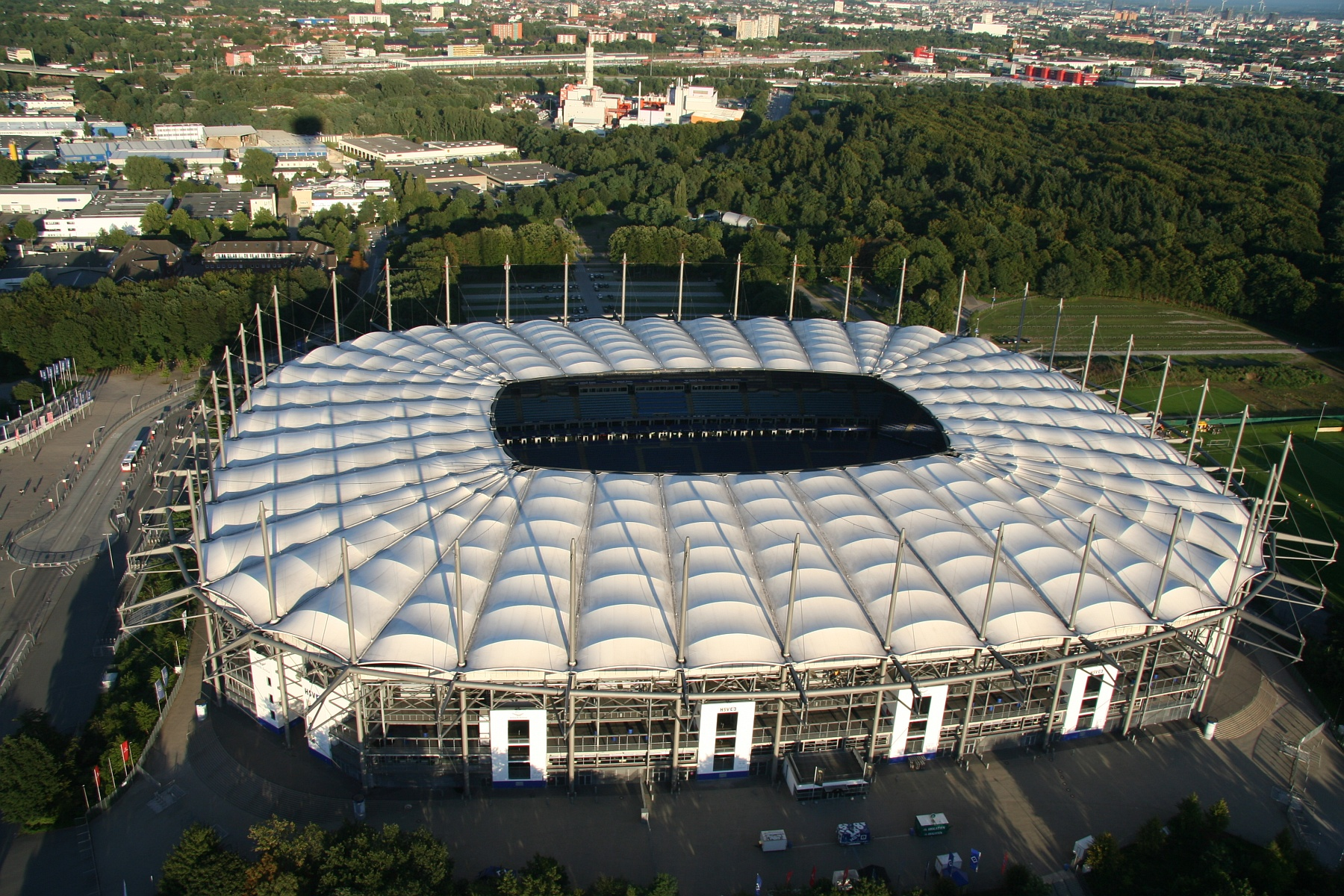
September 2010 aerial view of the Volksparkstadion

HSV was not involved with the origins of the stadium, even though they own the current arena. Before the sports club moved to the current site, they played at Sportplatz at Rothenbaum. Bahrenfelder Stadion was the first stadium to be built on the site of the Volksparkstadion and the AOL Arena. It was inaugurated on 13 September 1925 with a match between FC Altona 93 and HSV. In front a crowd of 25,000, HSV lost 2–3. At the time the stadium was also known as Altonaer Stadion, however it was not the home ground of FC Altona 93 (it was Adolf-Jäger-Kampfbahn).

After a long break the stadium was finally renovated. Between 1951 and 1953 the stadium was rebuilt. On 12 July the stadium was opened as Volksparkstadion (The People's Park Stadium), named after its location at Altona Volkspark (People's Park). Most of the building materials came from the ruins of Eimsbüttel, a district of Hamburg destroyed under Allied bombing. The new stadium could hold up to 75,000 and continued to be used for the various sporting events of the city.

In 1963, when HSV qualified for the newly created Bundesliga, they moved into the Volksparkstadion, a stadium that was both larger and more modern than Rothenbaum. HSV saw success in the Bundesliga. HSV won titles in 1979, 1982 and 1983.

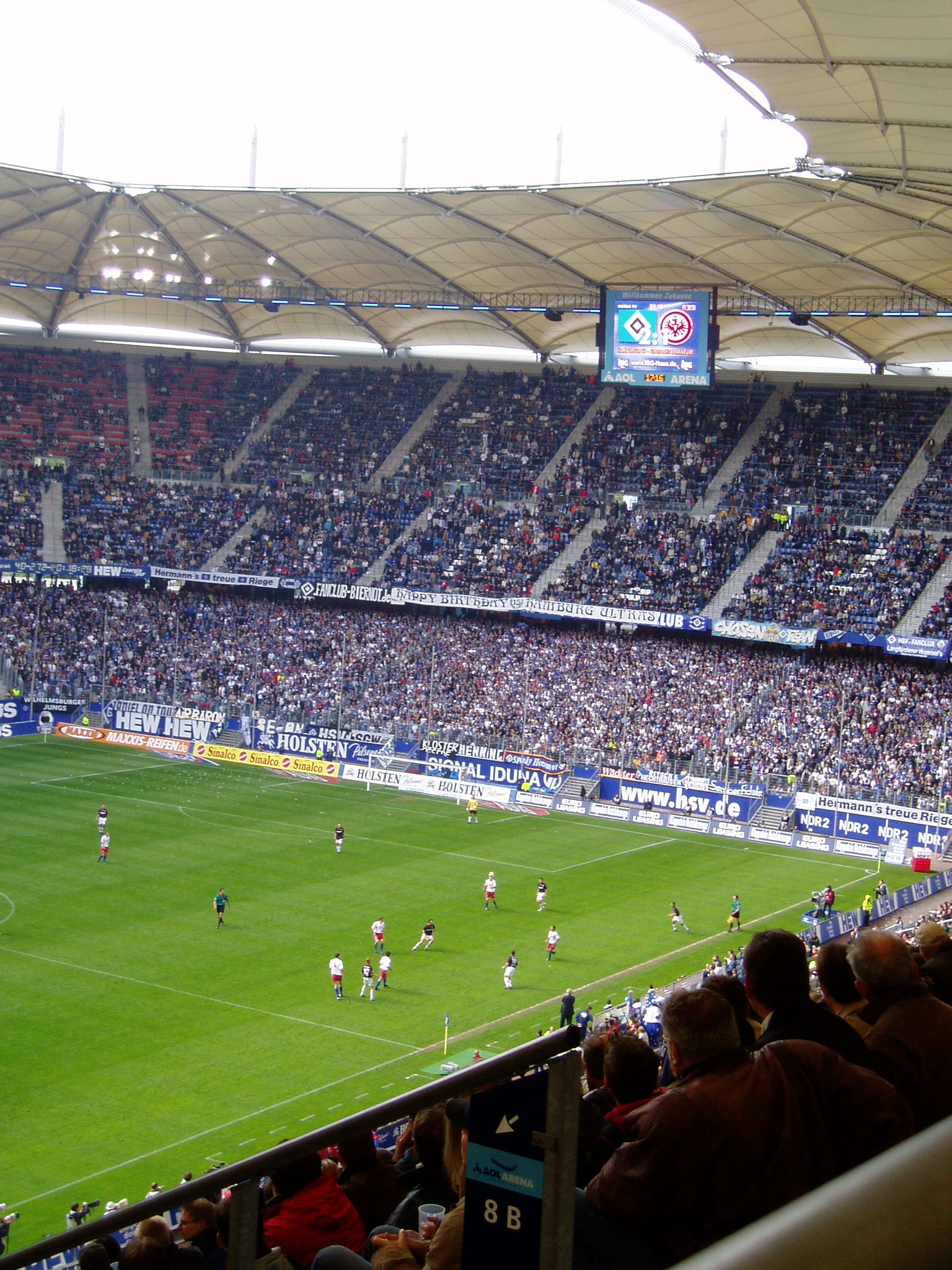
HSV v Eintracht Frankfurt, May 2004

In May 1996, HSV decided to replace the Volksparkstadion with a brand new stadium, not only to make Germany ready to host the Football World Cup, but also because it was getting increasingly difficult to meet the safety standards with such an old facility. The old stadium was demolished, and the new arena was rotated 90° to provide an equal viewing experience for all the stands and to take advantage of sunlight. The estimated cost of the new stadium was €90-100 million.

The new arena serves both as a football ground and a concert hall. The capacity of the stadium during club matches is 57,000, which is reduced to 51,500 during international matches when the standing sections in the north grandstand are converted into seated areas. The record attendance was attained in Hamburger SV's victory over Bayern Munich (1–0) on 30 January 2009, when 57,000 paying spectators were counted.

The building permit for the new arena was issued on 30 April 1998. The new stadium removed the track and field facilities that increased the distance between the pitch and the stands. The stadium was inaugurated on 2 September 2000 when Germany played Greece; the home team won 2–0. With the new stadium, HSV has attained an average attendance of 50,000. In 2004, a museum dedicated to the history of HSV was opened.

The stadium is a UEFA category 4 stadium, the highest level of stadium under UEFA regulations, which makes it eligible to host UEFA Europa League and UEFA Champions League finals.

A large clock was added to the northwest corner in 2001 to commemorate HSV's status as the only club to have played continuously in the Bundesliga since its foundation. The clock marked the time, down to the second, since the league was founded on 24 August 1963. However, after Hamburg's relegation to the 2nd tier, it was updated to reflect HSV's foundation. After the 2018–19 season though, the clock was ultimately taken down, replaced with the coordinates of the Volksparkstadion.

In 2001, AOL bought the naming rights to the Volksparkstadion for €15.3 million, retitling the ground as the AOL Arena. In March 2007, the HSH Nordbank bought the naming rights for €25 million, and the stadium was rebranded as the "HSH Nordbank Arena" in a six-year deal. From July 2010, the arena was called the Imtech Arena, after Imtech bought the naming rights. After Imtech's sponsorship ended in June 2015, the stadium reverted to its original name of Volksparkstadion. Due to UEFA regulations, when the stadium had a sponsored name, it was referred to as the Hamburg Arena [ˈhambʊʁk ʔaˌʁeːnaː] for European matches.

In the 2023–24 UEFA Champions League, the Volksparkstadion served as the home stadium for Ukrainian club Shakhtar Donetsk, who are unable to play at their normal home stadium due to the Russo–Ukrainian War.

== Tournaments hosted ==
=== 1974 FIFA World Cup ===
The 1974 FIFA World Cup was held in West Germany and the Volksparkstadion was one of the stadiums used in the tournament. In combination with the 1936 Berlin Olympic Stadium, the two stadiums held all of the Group A games of the first phase. The three games not involving Chile were played at the Volksparkstadion. The first game played was the match between East Germany and Australia (East Germany won 2–1) where attendance dipped to a low of only 17,000. The next game, with the home side West Germany playing Australia, saw a bounceback with 53,300 in attendance (West Germany won 3–0). The attendance grew even more for the next match to 60,200 as home side West Germany played neighbouring East Germany. East Germany won the close game 1–0 with an 77th-minute goal.

The following games were played at the stadium during the World Cup of 1974:

| Date | Time (CET) | Team #1 | Result | Team #2 | Round | Spectators |
|---|---|---|---|---|---|---|
| 14 June 1974 | 19:30 | East Germany | 2–0 | Australia | Group 1 | 17,000 |
| 18 June 1974 | 16:00 | Australia | 0–3 | West Germany | Group 1 | 53,000 |
| 22 June 1974 | 19:30 | East Germany | 1–0 | West Germany | Group 1 | 60,200 |

=== UEFA Euro 1988 ===
In 1988 the European Football Championship came to West Germany. The Volksparkstadion was chosen to be one of the host stadia. At the time the stadium could hold 61,200 spectators. The only game of the tournament that was played at the stadium was a semi-final that saw hosts West Germany lose to the Netherlands 1–2.

=== 2006 FIFA World Cup ===
The stadium was one of the venues for the 2006 FIFA World Cup. However, due to sponsorship contracts, the arena was known as FIFA World Cup Stadium Hamburg during the World Cup.

The following games were played at the stadium during the World Cup of 2006:

| Date | Time (CET) | Team #1 | Result | Team #2 | Round | Spectators |
|---|---|---|---|---|---|---|
| 10 June 2006 | 21:00 | Argentina | 2–1 | Ivory Coast | Group C | 49,480 |
| 15 June 2006 | 15:00 | Ecuador | 3–0 | Costa Rica | Group A | 50,000 |
| 19 June 2006 | 18:00 | Saudi Arabia | 0–4 | Ukraine | Group H | 50,000 |
| 22 June 2006 | 16:00 | Czech Republic | 0–2 | Italy | Group E | 50,000 |
| 30 June 2006 | 21:00 | Italy | 3–0 | Ukraine | Quarterfinals | 50,000 |

=== 2010 UEFA Europa League final ===
The stadium hosted the 2010 UEFA Europa League final, in which Spanish side Atlético Madrid beat English club Fulham 2–1.

=== UEFA Euro 2024 ===
Volksparkstadion hosted five UEFA Euro 2024 matches, including four group stage matches and a quarter-finals match.

| Date | Time (CEST) | Team #1 | Result | Team #2 | Round | Spectators |
|---|---|---|---|---|---|---|
| 16 June 2024 | 15:00 | Poland | 1–2 | Netherlands | Group D | 48,117 |
| 19 June 2024 | 15:00 | Croatia | 2–2 | Albania | Group B | 46,784 |
| 22 June 2024 | 15:00 | Georgia | 1–1 | Czech Republic | Group F | 46,524 |
| 26 June 2024 | 21:00 | Czech Republic | 1–2 | Turkey | Group F | 47,683 |
| 5 July 2024 | 21:00 | Portugal | 0–0 (3–5 pen.) | France | Quarter-finals | 47,789 |

== Transport ==
The stadium's nearest railway station is Stellingen railway station. The station is on the S3 and S5 lines of the Hamburg S-Bahn and is also served from Schleswig-Holstein in the north by AKN railways. A free bus shuttle service is provided during football matches or other major events from Stellingen railway station and from Othmarschen railway station to the stadium. There are several large car parks around the stadium. The A7 runs close by and the stadium can be reached via the exit Hamburg-Volkspark.

== Other uses ==
The stadium hosted the heavyweight unification boxing match between Wladimir Klitschko and David Haye on 2 July 2011. Klitschko won by unanimous decision. The stadium sold out.

The stadium hosted the German leg of the worldwide concert event Live Earth on 7 July 2007. Among the artists performing in Hamburg were Snoop Dogg, Eminem and Cat Stevens/Yusuf Islam. Other musical performances at the Volksparkstadion include those of: Michael Jackson, in 1988 as part of his Bad World Tour and 1992 as part of his Dangerous World Tour; Tina Turner in 1996 during her "Wildest Dreams Tour" and in 2000 during her "Twenty Four Seven Tour"; Depeche Mode in 2009 during their Tour of the Universe and in 2013 during their Delta Machine Tour; Metallica in 2014 as a part of their By Request Tour and again in 2023 as a part of their M72 World Tour; AC/DC in 2016 for their Rock or Bust World Tour; Coldplay in 2016 for their A Head Full of Dreams Tour; Rihanna in 2016 for her Anti World Tour; P!nk in 2019 for her Beautiful Trauma World Tour, and Harry Styles in 2022 for his Love On Tour. Beyoncé in 2023 for her Renaissance World Tour, followed by The Weeknd as part of his After Hours til Dawn Tour performed at the stadium on 2 July 2023. Taylor Swift performed at the stadium on 23 and 24 July 2024 as part of her The Eras Tour. Linkin Park will perform two shows on 1 and 3 July 2026 as part of their From Zero World Tour.

== Panorama ==
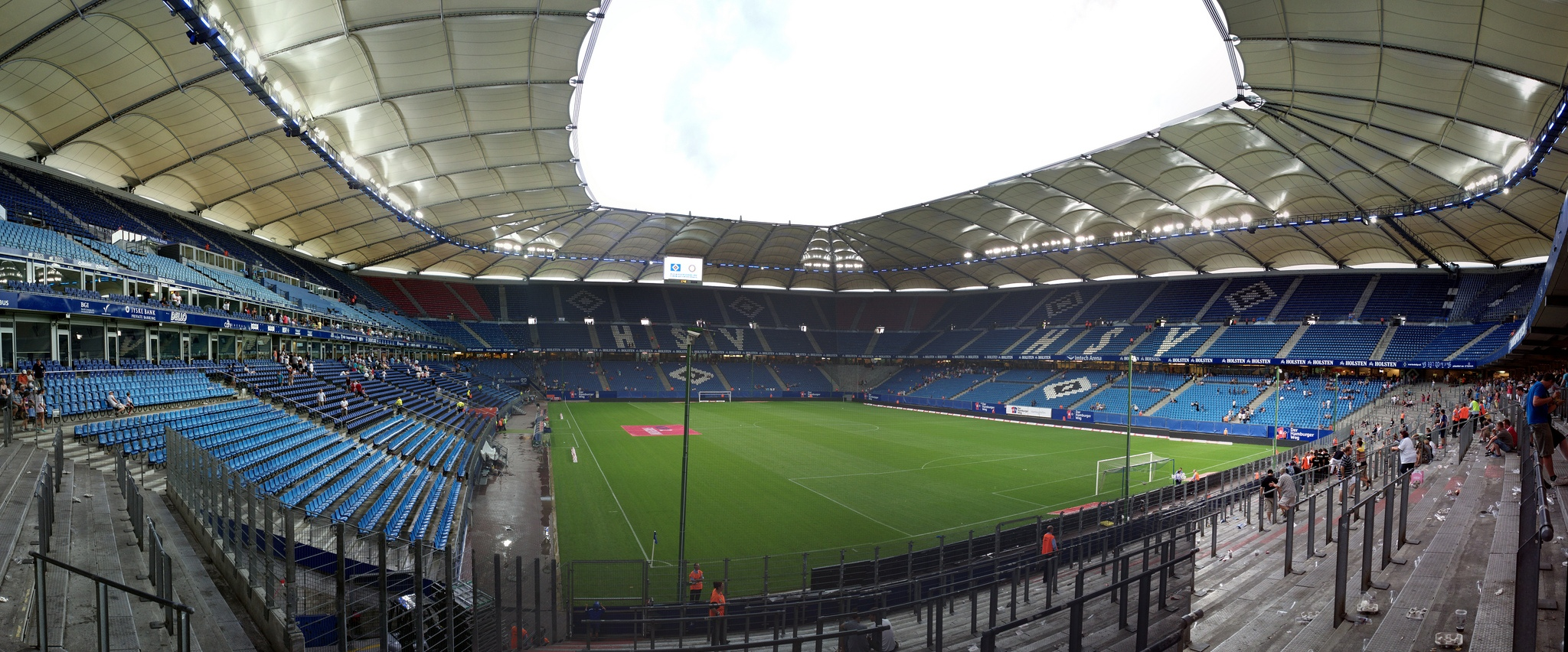
The Volksparkstadion in 2010

| Preceded by Şükrü Saracoğlu Stadium; Istanbul | UEFA Europa League; Final venue 2010 | Succeeded by Aviva Stadium; Dublin |
