= Altona Volkspark =

Urban park in Hamburg, Germany

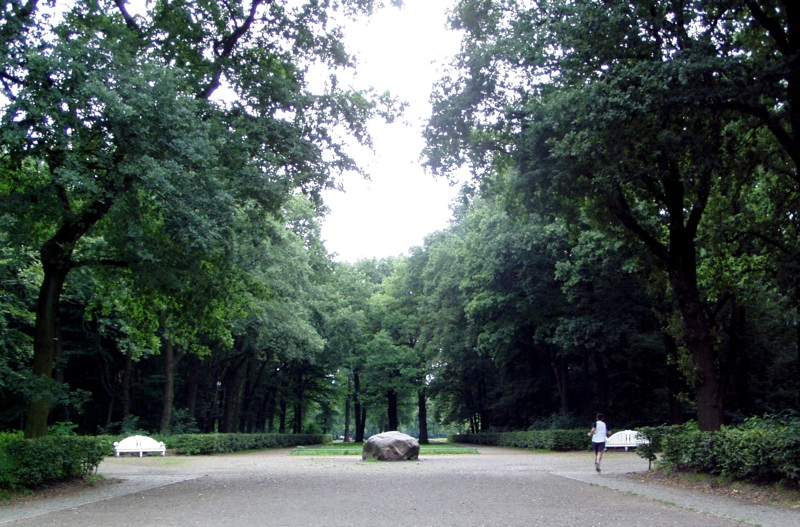
- Inside Altona Volkspark
- Interactive map of Altona Volkspark
- Type: Public park
- Location: August-Kirch-Straße; 22525 Hamburg
- Coordinates: 53°34′49″N 9°54′13″E
- Area: 205 ha (2.05 km^{2})
- Opened: 1914
- Manager: BSU
- Open: All year
- Public transit: Stellingen

Altona Volkspark is a 205-hectare (507-acre) large urban park in the Hamburg district of Bahrenfeld, in the borough of Altona. Ahead of Hamburg Stadtpark, it is the largest park in Hamburg. Altona Volkspark is located some 3 km off the inner city. The largest parks in the city-center are Planten un Blomen and Alsterpark.

Notably, Hamburger SV home ground Volksparkstadion, Barclaycard Arena and Volksbank Arena are located within the park's fringes.

== Overview ==
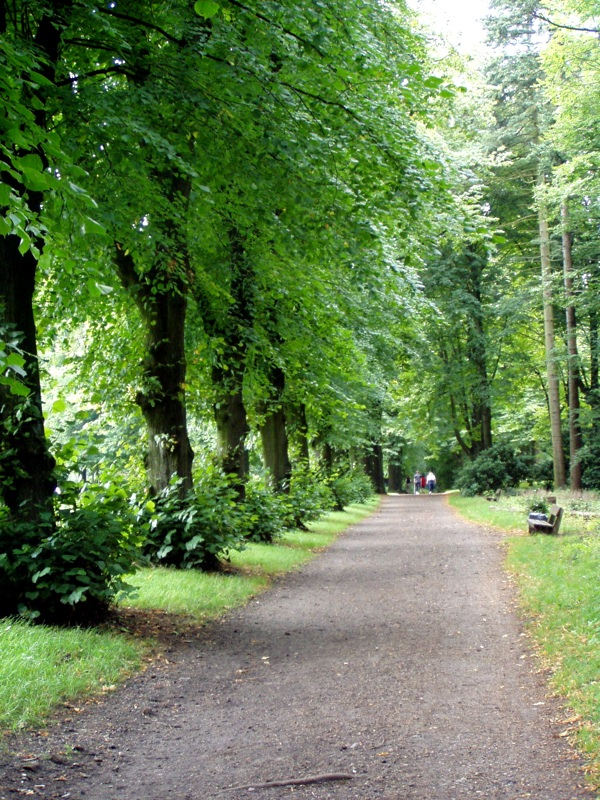
A pathway in Altona Volkspark

Altona Volkspark was developed in four phases. Designed and built by then Garden director Ferdinand Tutenberg (1874–1956), the first section was developed between 1914 and 1915. Subsequent parts of the park were opened in 1918, 1920 and 1928. Altona Volkspark was conceptualized as a people's park with areas for play, sport, recreation and education, instead of artistic representation or architectural principles. It is therefore characterized by a lot of untouched nature, rather than formal park design.

The park also contains the Bahrenfeld harness racetrack (Trabrennbahn) and the Altona Dahlia Garden.
