= Ottensen =

Quarter of Hamburg, Germany

- Quarter of Hamburg
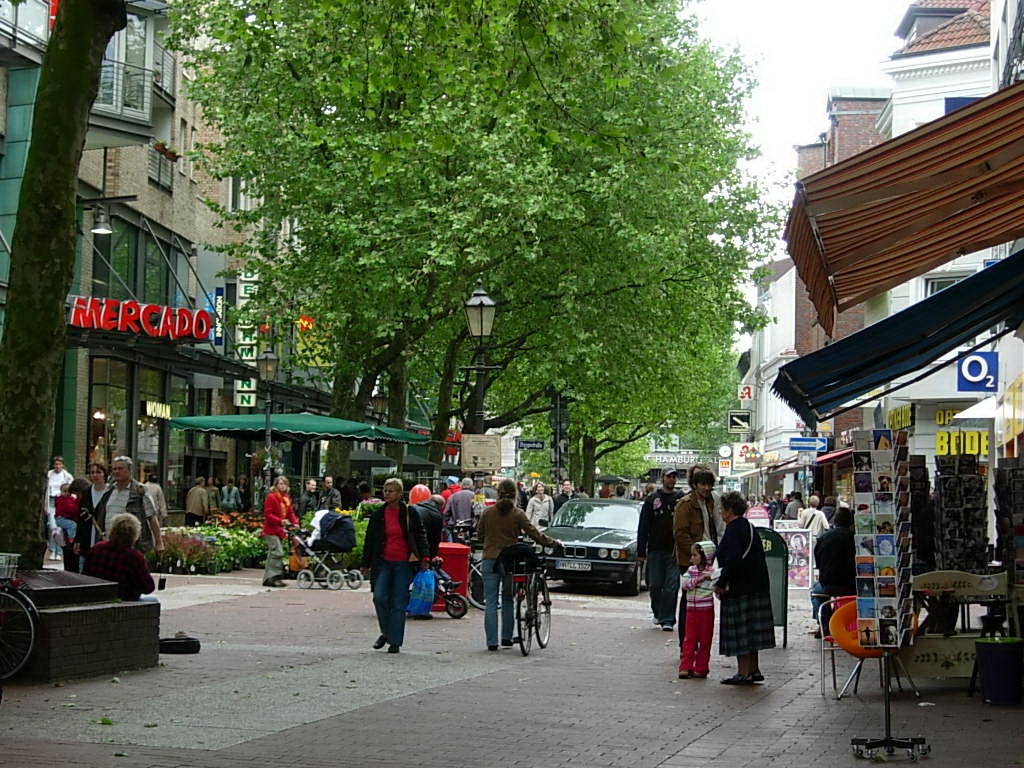
- Ottenser Hauptstraße (pedestrian area)

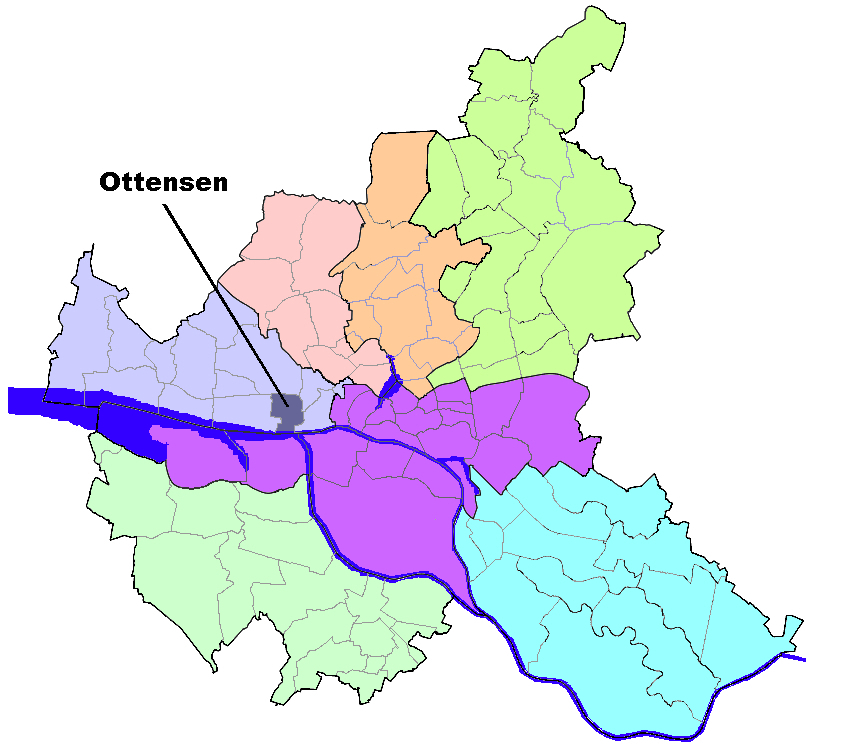
- Location of the quarter Ottensen in Hamburg
- Interactive map of Ottensen
- Location within Germany Location within Hamburg
- Coordinates: 53°33′14″N 9°55′4″E
- Country: Germany
- State: Hamburg
- City: Hamburg
- Borough: Altona, Hamburg

Area
  - Total: 2.9 km^{2} (1.1 sq mi)

Population (2024-12-31)
  - Total: 35,925
  - Density: 12,000/km^{2} (32,000/sq mi)
- Time zone: UTC+01:00 (CET)
  - Summer (DST): UTC+02:00 (CEST)
- Dialling codes: 040
- Vehicle registration: HH

Ottensen (German pronunciation: [ˈɔtn̩zn̩]) is a former town located in Hamburg, Germany in the Altona borough on the northern bank of the Elbe river. It is a now one of the 104 quarters of Hamburg.

== History ==
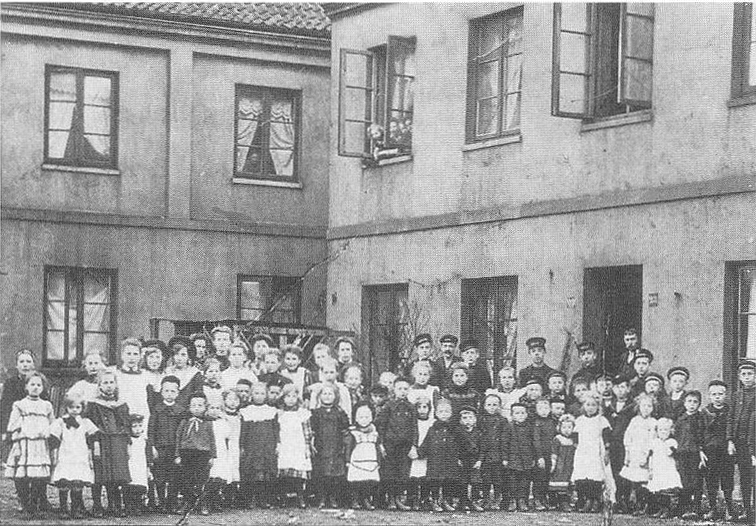
Children of gaffers, in the background company houses of Glasfabrik C. E. Gätcke in Ottensen next to Altona/Elbe, Germany

The first record of Ottensen dates from 1310 under the name Ottenhusen. In 1390, it became the seat of the bailiff of the county of Holstein-Pinneberg. The settlement was mostly composed of farmers and craftsmen. During the 1640s, it surpassed nearby Altona in size. It was annexed to Prussia in 1867, and the population rose rapidly: from 2,411 in 1840 to 37,738 in 1900.

It was later annexed to the city Altona, which in turn, due to the Greater Hamburg Act, was annexed to Hamburg in 1937.

== Geography ==
According to the statistical office of Hamburg and Schleswig-Holstein, the quarter has a total area of 2.9 square kilometres (1 sq mi). The southern border to the quarter Waltershof is the river Elbe. The railway tracks of the city train is the north border to Bahrenfeld and the eastern border to the Altona-Altstadt quarter. In the West is the quarter Othmarschen.

== Demographics ==
In 2006, 32,757 people were registered as living in the quarter Ottensen. The population density was 11,445 inhabitants per square kilometre (29,642/sq mi). 14.3% were children under the age of 18, and 12.7% were 65 years of age or older. 16.2% were immigrants. 1,863 people were registered as unemployed. In 1999 there were 18,959 households, out of which 16.6% had children under the age of 18 living with them and 55.9% of all households were made up of individuals. The average household size was 1.72.

In 2006 there were 3,558 criminal offences (109 crimes per 1,000 people).

== Education ==
There were 4 primary schools and 2 secondary schools in Ottensen.

== Culture ==
=== Museums, galleries ===
The Altonaer Museum Norddeutsches Landesmuseum (Northern German country museum) is museum dedicated among other things to the history and culture of the coastal area of northern Germany. Founded in 1863, it is today located in the street Museumsstrasse near to the Hamburg-Altona railway station. The museum has 4 branches, the Altonaer Museum itself, the Jenisch Haus for art and culture in the Othmarschen quarter, the Rieck Haus in the quarter Curslack and the Heine Haus at Elbchaussee 23.

=== Performing arts ===
The Altonaer Theater is located in the street Museumsstrasse 17. It was founded in 1876 as Altonaer Stadttheater at Königstrasse. Destroyed in 1943, a new location was found in the school Museumsstrasse. In 1954 the Altonaer Theater was reopened there with Hans Fitze as the theatre manager. In 1994 the theatre closed due to financial problems. In 1995 the theatre was reopened and play until today.

The smaller stage Thalia an der Gaußstraße of the Hamburg Thalia Theater is located in Ottensen.

=== Recreation ===
In Ottensen are two small park areas, Donnerspark and Rathenaupark.

=== Sports ===
The football club FC Teutonia Ottensen is one of several sports associations using the facilities in Ottensen.

== Infrastructure ==
=== Health systems ===
The Altonaer Kinderkrankenhaus is a hospital for children with 195 beds located Bleickenallee 36. The Asklepios Klinik Wandsbek has a day care facility for psychiatric problems in the Bülowstr. 8.

In Ottensen were 32 day care centers for children and also 130 physicians in private practice and 11 pharmacies.

=== Transport ===
Ottensen is served by the rapid transit system of the city train (Ottensen S-Bahn Station). The quarter is connected with the national and international railway system through the Hamburg-Altona station.

According to the Department of Motor Vehicles (Kraftfahrt-Bundesamt), in the quarter were 9,894 private cars registered (305 cars/1000 people). There were 133 traffic accidents total, including 105 traffic accidents with damage to persons.

== Notable people ==
- Johann Rist (1607-1667), poet, hymn writer and pastor
- Max Brauer (1887-1973), first elected First Mayor of Hamburg after World War II

== Notes ==
=== References ===
- Statistisches Amt für Hamburg und Schleswig-Holstein, official website (in German)
- Hospitals in Hamburg 2006, Government Agency for Social Affairs, Family Affairs, Health and Environment of Hamburg website (in German)

The section history is based on the corresponding article from the German Wikipedia, accessed on 25 February 2007
