= Lohbrügge =

- Quarter of Hamburg
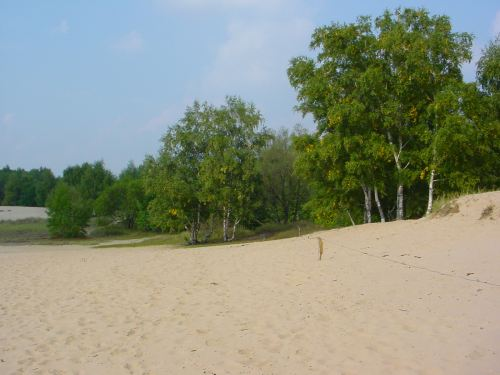
- Boberger dune in Lohbrügge

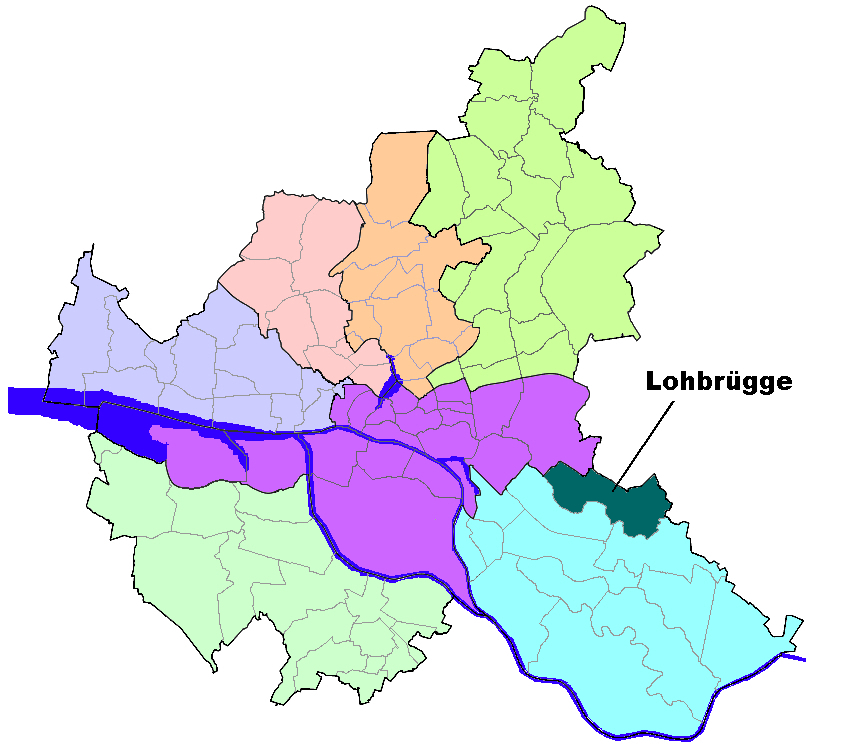
- Location of Lohbrügge in the city of Hamburg
- Interactive map of Lohbrügge
- Location within Germany Location within Hamburg
- Coordinates: 53°30′34″N 10°10′56″E
- Country: Germany
- State: Hamburg
- City: Hamburg
- Borough: Bergedorf

Area
  - Total: 13 km^{2} (5.0 sq mi)

Population (2024-12-31)
  - Total: 41,400
  - Density: 3,200/km^{2} (8,200/sq mi)
- Time zone: UTC+01:00 (CET)
  - Summer (DST): UTC+02:00 (CEST)
- Dialling codes: 040
- Vehicle registration: HH

Lohbrügge (German pronunciation: [loːˈbʁʏɡə]) is a quarter in the Bergedorf borough of the Free and Hanseatic city of Hamburg in northern Germany. In 2020, the population was 40,745.

== Geography ==
In 2006, according to the statistical office of Hamburg and Schleswig-Holstein, the Lohbrügge quarter has a total area of 13 km^{2}.

The western border is to the quarter Billwerder. In the East and North is the state Schleswig-Holstein and the Billstedt quarter of the borough Hamburg-Mitte. In the South is the border to the Bergedorf quarter.

In Lohbrügge is the landscape conservation area Boberger dune (German: Boberger Düne, pronounced [ˈboːˌbɛʁɡɐ ˈdyːnə]).

== Demographics ==
In 2006, 38,343 people were living in Lohbrügge quarter. The population density was 2,939 people per km^{2}. 16.4% were children under the age of 18, and 24.8% were 65 years of age or older. 10.1% were immigrants. 2,045 people were registered as unemployed and 11,038 were employees subject to social insurance contributions.

In 1999, there were 18,017 households, out of which 20.3% had children under the age of 18 living with them, and 39.1% of all households were made up of individuals. The average household size was 1.02.

In 2006, 3,935 criminal offences were counted in Lohbrügge (103 crimes per 1000 people).

=== Population by year ===
The population is counted by the residential registration office for 31 December each year.

1987	1988	1989	1990	1991	1992	1993	1994	1995	1996
36,144	35,987	35,929	36,239	36,291	36,314	36,676	36,498	36,611	36,349

1997	1998	1999	2000	2001	2002	2003	2004	2005	2006
35,945	35,808	36,031	36,763	37,165	37,583	37,764	38,093	38,082	38,343

== Education ==
The campus Bergedorf of the Hamburg University of Applied Sciences is at the street Lohbrügger Kirchstr.

In 2006, there were 4 elementary schools and 6 secondary schools in the quarter Lohbrügge.

== Politics ==
These are the results of Lohbrügge in the Hamburg state election:

State Election	SPD	Greens	CDU	AfD	Left	FDP	Others
2020	46,8 %	15,1 %	11,5 %	8,7 %	8,2 %	3,3 %	6,4 %
2015	55,2 %	6,5 %	14,6 %	7,7 %	7,3 %	5,5 %	3,2 %
2011	54,3 %	6,6 %	23,0 %	–	6,1 %	4,6 %	5,4 %
2008	37,8 %	5,4 %	44,3 %	–	6,0 %	3,6 %	3,0 %
2004	34,6 %	6,1 %	48,9 %	–	–	2,7 %	7,8 %
2001	40,6 %	4,4 %	27,2 %	–	0,2 %	3,3 %	24,3 %
1997	40,3 %	8,5 %	29,6 %	–	0,4 %	2,5 %	18,7 %
1993	45,9 %	9,3 %	23,0 %	–	–	3,2 %	18,6 %

== Infrastructure ==
=== Health systems ===
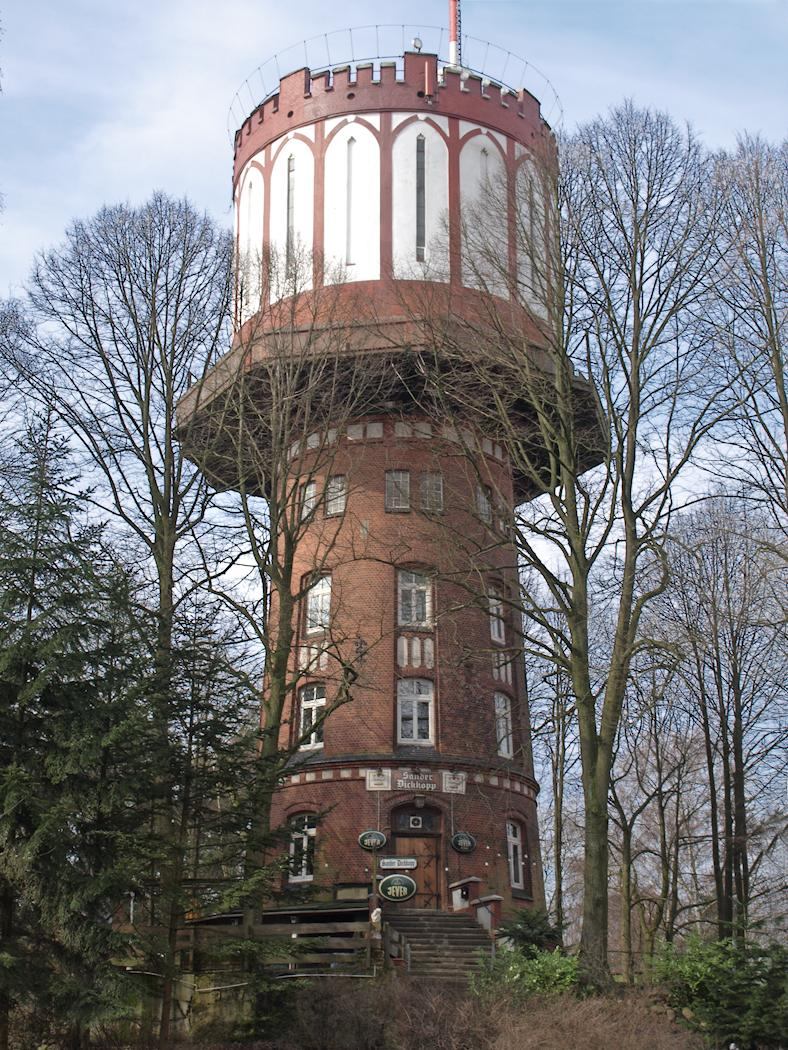
Sander Dickkopp

A general hospital of the German Accident Prevention & Insurance Association (Berufsgenossenschaftliches Unfallkrankenhaus Boberg) with 470 beds in 8 departments is located in the street Bergedorfer Str. 10. The hospital has one of the few units for heavy-burned patients in northern Germany. The hospital has the capacity to dispatch emergency medical services. A rescue helicopter is operated in cooperation with the hospital. The hospital is a teaching hospital for the University of Lübeck.

In 2006, 16 day care centers for children and also 51 physicians in private practice and 7 pharmacies existed in Lohbrügge.

=== Transportation ===
Lohbrügge is serviced by the rapid transit system of the city train (Lines S2 and S21) by Bergedorf station, which is situated directly at the boundary between Lohbrügge and Bergedorf. However the main part of the public transportation in the quarter itself and its surroundings is provided by buses.

In 2006, according to the Department of Motor Vehicles (Kraftfahrt-Bundesamt), in the quarter were 14,478 private cars registered (380 cars/1000 people). There were 137 traffic accidents total, including 114 traffic accidents with damage to persons.

Near Lohbrügge is an exit of the Bundesautobahn 1 and the Bundesautobahn 25.

== Points of interest ==
- Arboretum Lohbrügge

== Notes ==
=== References ===
- Statistical office Hamburg and Schleswig-Holstein Statistisches Amt für Hamburg und Schleswig-Holstein, official website (in German)
- List of hospitals in Hamburg 2006, Government Agency for Social Affairs, Family Affairs, Health and Environment of Hamburg website (in German)
- Website of the hospital Boberg Berufsgenossenschaftliches Unfallkrankenhaus Boberg (in German)
