= Bahrenfeld =

- Quarter of Hamburg
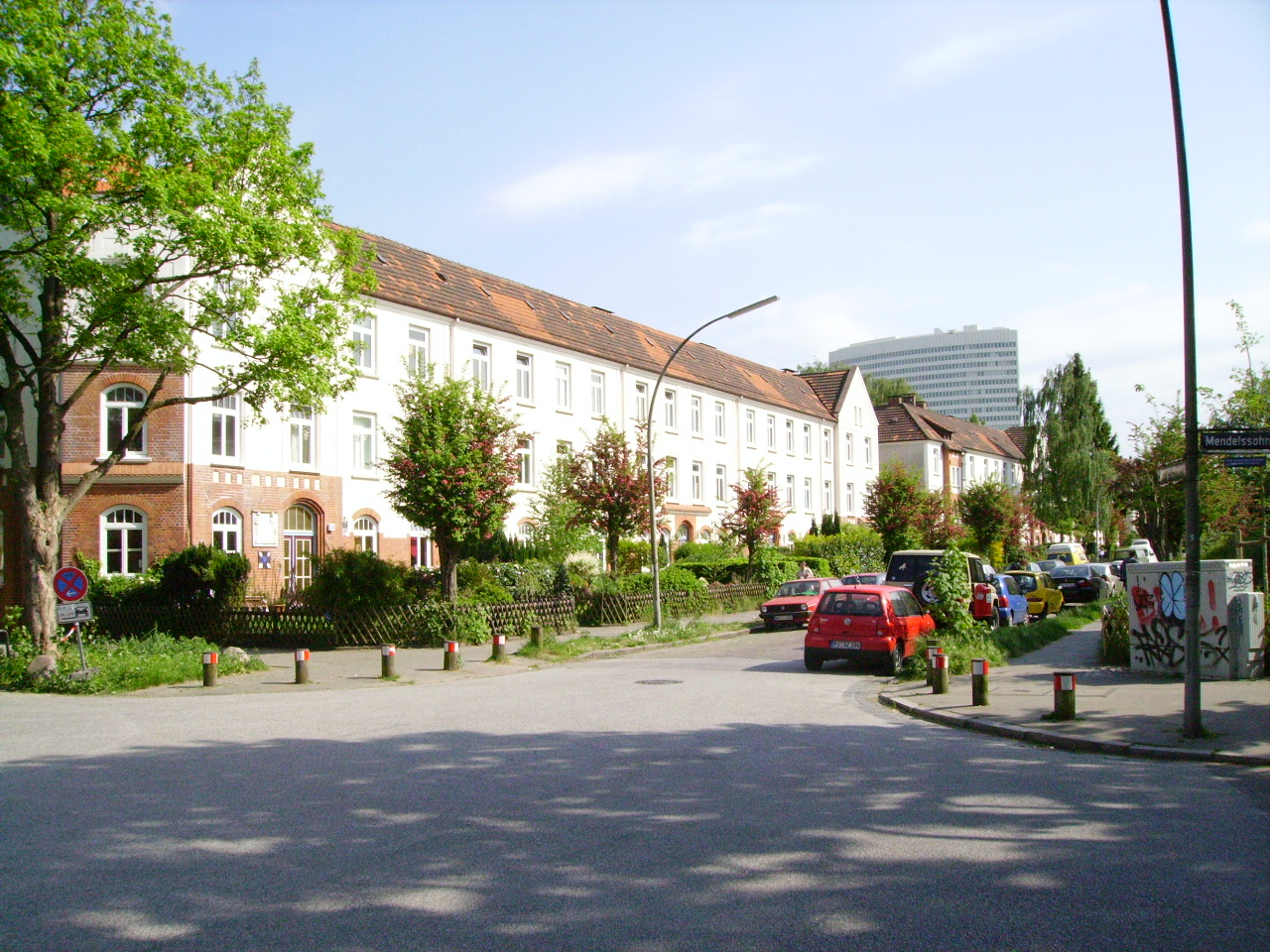
- Street in Bahrenfeld (in background Hermes agency building, Ottensen)

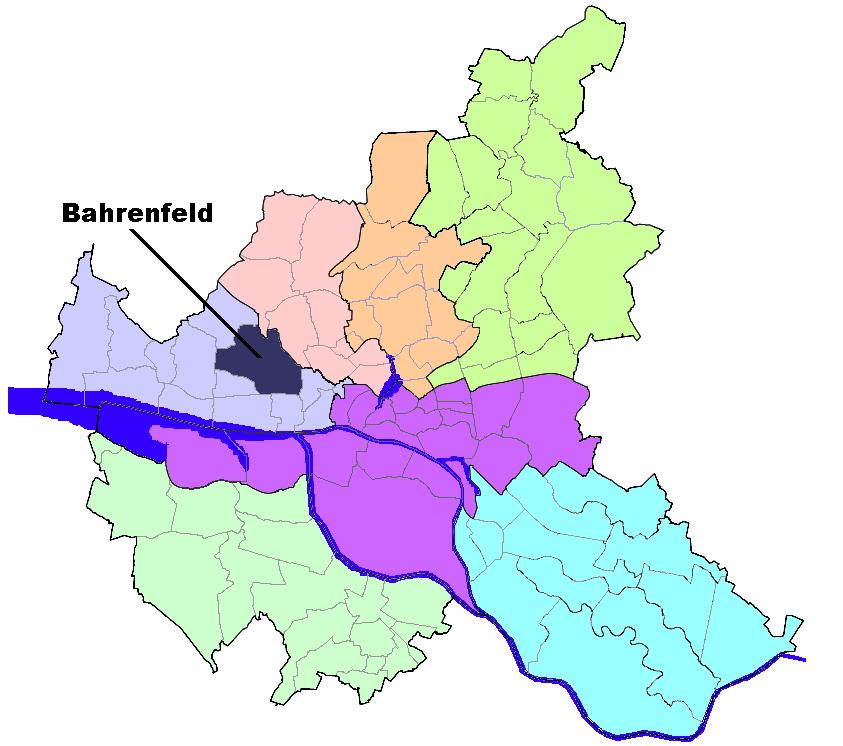
- Location of Bahrenfeld in Hamburg
- Interactive map of Bahrenfeld
- Location within Germany Location within Hamburg
- Coordinates: 53°34′N 9°53′E
- Country: Germany
- State: Hamburg
- City: Hamburg
- Borough: Altona
- Founded: 1265

Area
  - Total: 10.9 km^{2} (4.2 sq mi)

Population (2024-12-31)
  - Total: 31,051
  - Density: 2,850/km^{2} (7,380/sq mi)
- Time zone: UTC+01:00 (CET)
  - Summer (DST): UTC+02:00 (CEST)
- Postal codes: 22761
- Dialling codes: 040
- Vehicle registration: HH

Bahrenfeld (German pronunciation: [ˈbaːʁənfɛlt]) is a western quarter of the city of Hamburg in Germany, it is subject to the district/borough Bezirk Altona and was an independent settlement until 1890. It is home to DESY and the Barclays Arena. In 2023 the population was 31,438.

== History ==
The first records of Bahrenfeld dates 1256. In 1890 it was suburbanized into the city Altona. During Nazi Germany 1938 with the Greater Hamburg Act the city of Altona (including Bahrenfeld) was merged into Hamburg.

History section is based on a translation of the German article Bahrenfeld

== Geography ==
Bahrenfeld is mixed of commercial and residential areas. In 2006 according to the statistical office of Hamburg and Schleswig-Holstein, the quarter has a total area of 10.9 square kilometres (4 sq mi). Bahrenfeld is located south of Lurup and Eidelstedt, west of Stellingen and east of Osdorf. The southern boundaries to the quarters Othmarschen and Ottensen are the railway tracks of the city train. To the south west lies Groß Flottbek.

== Politics ==
These are the results of the Hamburg state election:

| Election | Greens | SPD | Left | CDU | AfD | FDP | Others |
|---|---|---|---|---|---|---|---|
| 2020 | 32,9 % | 32,1 % | 16,3 % | 5,5 % | 3,1 % | 2,8 % | 7,3 % |
| 2015 | 19,1 % | 44,9 % | 14,3 % | 7,8 % | 3,8 % | 4,8 % | 5,3 % |
| 2011 | 15,5 % | 51,7 % | 9,0 % | 12,6 % | – | 4,2 % | 7,0 % |
| 2008 | 13,8 % | 38,8 % | 8,5 % | 31,9 % | – | 4,1 % | 2,9 % |

== Demographics ==
In 2006 in the quarter Bahrenfeld were living 26,434 people. The population density was 2,435/km^{2} (6,307/sq mi). 14.8% were children under the age of 18, and 15.5% were 65 years of age or older. 16.8% were immigrants. 1583 people were registered as unemployed. In 1999 there were 14,230 households, out of which 16.8% had children under the age of 18 living with them and 52.3% of all households were made up of individuals. The average household size was 1.78.

== Culture ==
=== Performing arts ===
In the neighbourhood Otto von Bahrenpark, a new created area at the location of an old gas plant, the Lichthof Theater is located in the street Mendelssohnstr. 16. It is a private theatre founded 1994 operating as a registered voluntary association. In August 2000 the theatre moved to the location Mendelssohnstrasse to a new auditorium for about 100 spectators.

=== Cemeteries ===
Altona Main Cemetery, Altonaer Hauptfriedhof, is located at the Altona Volkspark. Beside a Jewish cemetery, a Mennonite cemetery there are several Lutheran cemeteries. All this is a relict of freedom of belief in the history of Altona.

== Parks ==
Located in Bahrenfeld is the Altona Volkspark. A large recreation area (205 hectares) established 1920.

The smaller Bonnepark is located between the Bundesautobahn 7, Bundesstraße 431 and a local road.

== Sports ==
The Trabrennbahn Bahrenfeld is a harness racing arena. Founded 1874 it is also a location for music concerts, e.g. it was one of the locations for the Bridges to Babylon Tour in 1998. In the northern part of the Altonaer Volkspark is the Barclaycard Arena, former home of the Hamburg Freezers, and one of the two homes of the Handball Hamburg club. The nearby Volksparkstadion is home to the football section of the Hamburger SV club. Another club is the Bahrenfelder SV.

== Education ==
There were 4 elementary schools and 2 secondary schools in the quarter and 30 physicians in private practice and 5 pharmacies. Parts of the world known Hamburg site of the research center DESY for particle physics, founded 1959, are located in the quarter.

== Transportation ==
Bahrenfeld is serviced by the rapid transit system of the city or suburban railway with the Bahrenfeld station and the Diebsteich station.

According to the Department of Motor Vehicles (Kraftfahrt-Bundesamt), in the quarter were 8,942 private cars registered (337 cars/1000 people).

In Bahrenfeld is the exit Hamburg-Bahrenfeld of the Bundesautobahn 7/E 45. At this point the Bundesstrasse 431 is crossing the motorway, connecting Altona with Meldorf in Schleswig-Holstein.

== Literature ==
- Martin Wendt, Wie Bahrenfeld wurde. Von der Steinzeit bis heute - die Chronik eines Hamburger Stadtteils., in: 750 Jahre Bahrenfeld, Hamburg 2006 (Festschrift, hg. v. Bürgerverein Bahrenfeld) (in German)
- Johanna Wolff, Spaziergänge durch Bahrenfeld. Hamburg 1990 (Ergebnisse) (in German)
