= Niendorf Markt station =

Railway station in Hamburg, Germany

Niendorf Markt
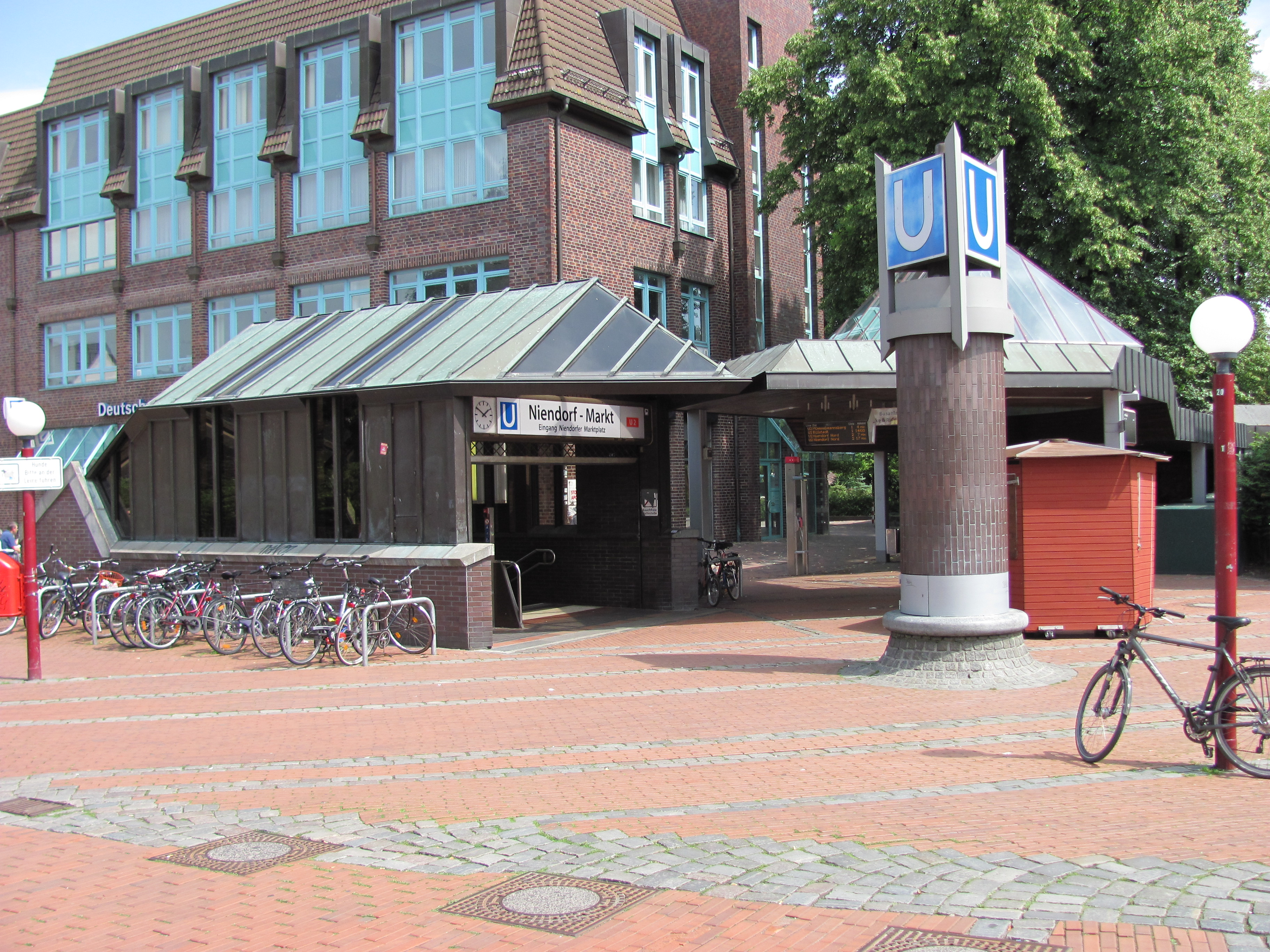
- The southwest entrance to Niendorf Markt

General information
- Location: Garstedter Weg; 22459 Hamburg; Germany
- Coordinates: 53.6197°N 9.9515°E
- System: Hamburg U-Bahn station
- Operator: Hamburger Hochbahn AG
- Line: U2
- Platforms: 1 island platform
- Tracks: 2
- Connections: Bus

Construction
- Structure type: At grade
- Accessible: Yes

Other information
- Station code: HHA: NM
- Fare zone: HVV: A/203

History
- Opened: 2 June 1985; 41 years ago

Services
Preceding station	Hamburg U-Bahn	Following station
Joachim-Mähl-Straße towards Niendorf Nord	U2	Hagendeel towards Mümmelmannsberg
Location

Niendorf Markt is a metro station in Niendorf on the Hamburg U-Bahn line U2.

== History ==
Since 1955, the Hamburg tram system had been scaled back, until 1978, when the last tram line, line 2, to Niendorf ceased operations. In order to replace the tram line, a metro line to Niendorf was required. Since there was no money to finance the cost of building a new line from Stephansplatz to Niendorf via the Grindel quarter, Hoheluft, and Lokstedt, which would have followed the path of the former tram line 2, it was decided that the line to Eimsbüttel (the U2) would be extended instead.

The construction of the subway extension to Niendorf began on 7 July 1979, almost a year after the tram line had been replaced by buses. At the same time, it was decided that Niendorf Markt would not be the terminus of the extension, but instead, that the line would be extended further to the new development areas of Niendorf Nord in a second construction phase. At the former terminus, Hagenbecks Tierpark, the sidings were rebuilt for the extension, which ran completely underground for environmental reasons.

On 5 November 1984, a museum train carrying politicians and reporters came to Niendorf Markt. The train was pulled by a diesel locomotive, since the line had not yet been electrified. The official opening of Niendorf Markt occurred a little under a year later, on 2 June 1985. The completion of the northern extension of the line to Niendorf Nord took until 9 March 1991, such that Niendorf Markt was the terminus of the U2 for about six years.

== Services ==
Niendorf Markt is served by Hamburg U-Bahn line U2.
