= Hagenbecks Tierpark station =

Railway station in Hamburg, Germany

Hagenbecks Tierpark
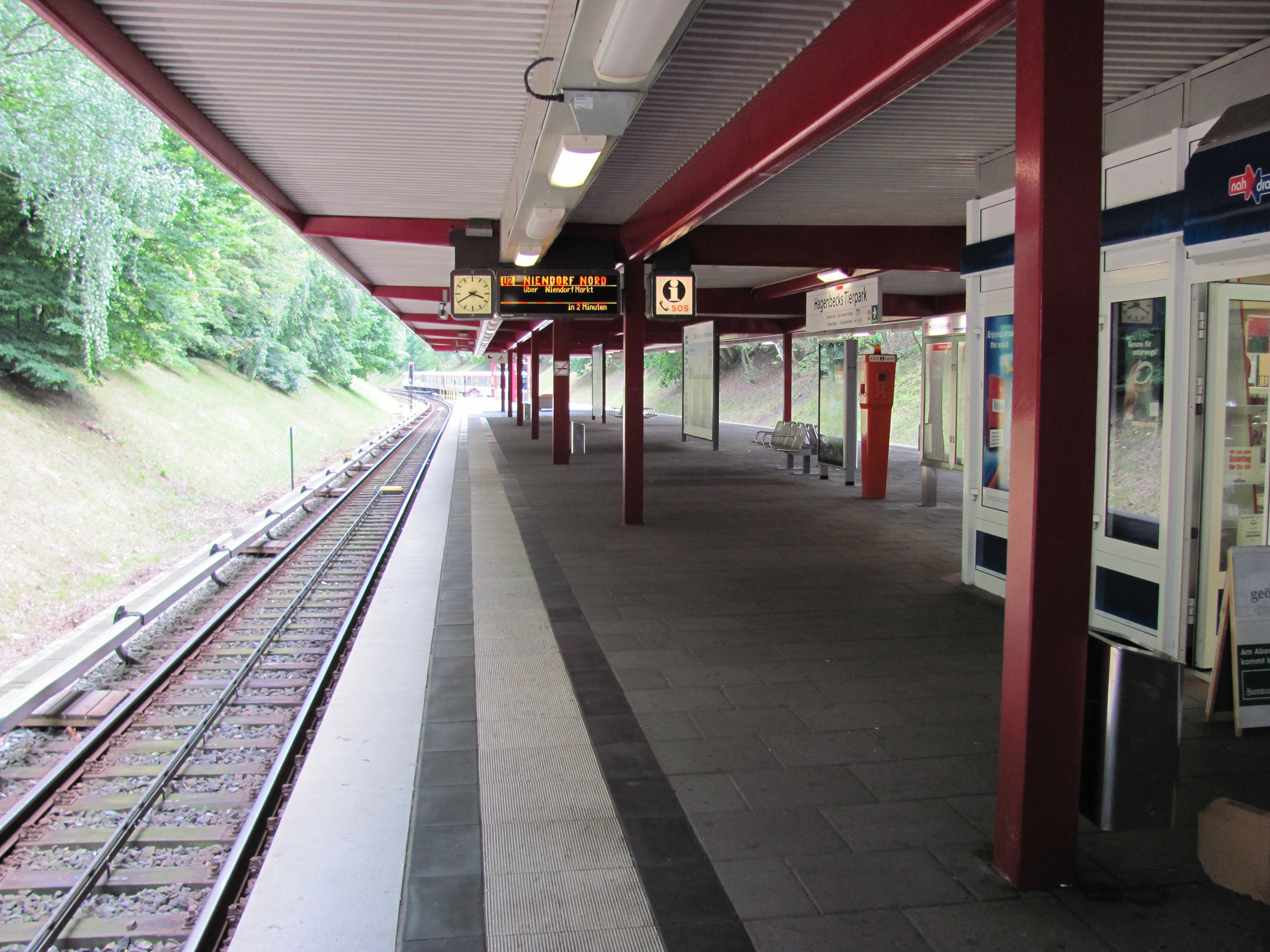
- The platform at Hagenbecks Tierpark

General information
- Location: Koppelstraße; 22527 Hamburg, Germany; Germany
- Coordinates: 53.5925°N 9.9441°E
- System: Hamburg U-Bahn station
- Operator: Hamburger Hochbahn AG
- Line: U2
- Platforms: 1 island platform
- Tracks: 2
- Connections: Bus

Construction
- Structure type: At grade
- Accessible: Yes

Other information
- Station code: HHA: HG
- Fare zone: HVV: A/101, 103, and 203

History
- Opened: 30 October 1966; 59 years ago

Services
| Preceding station | Hamburg U-Bahn | Following station |
|---|---|---|
| Hagendeel towards Niendorf Nord | U2 | Lutterothstraße towards Mümmelmannsberg |
Location

Hagenbecks Tierpark is a metro station on the Hamburg U-Bahn line U2. It is located in the Stellingen district of Hamburg within the borough of Eimsbüttel. It serves the Tierpark Hagenbeck.

== History ==
In 1961, the Senate of Hamburg decided to build a cross-city route from Stellingen to Billstedt, whose already existing western part was extended from the former Hellkamp stop over the Lutterothstraße station to Hagenbeck's Tierpark, which was originally supposed to be called "Koppelstraße." While the line to Lutterothstraße was opened in 1965, Hagenbecks Tierpark station was not opened until 30 October 1966. The new line replaced tram line 16.

For almost 19 years, Hagenbecks Tierpark was the terminus of the U2, until the extension to Niendorf Markt in 1985.

== Service ==
Hagenbecks Tierpark station is served by the U2.
