= Merkenstraße station =

Hamburg metro station

Merkenstraße
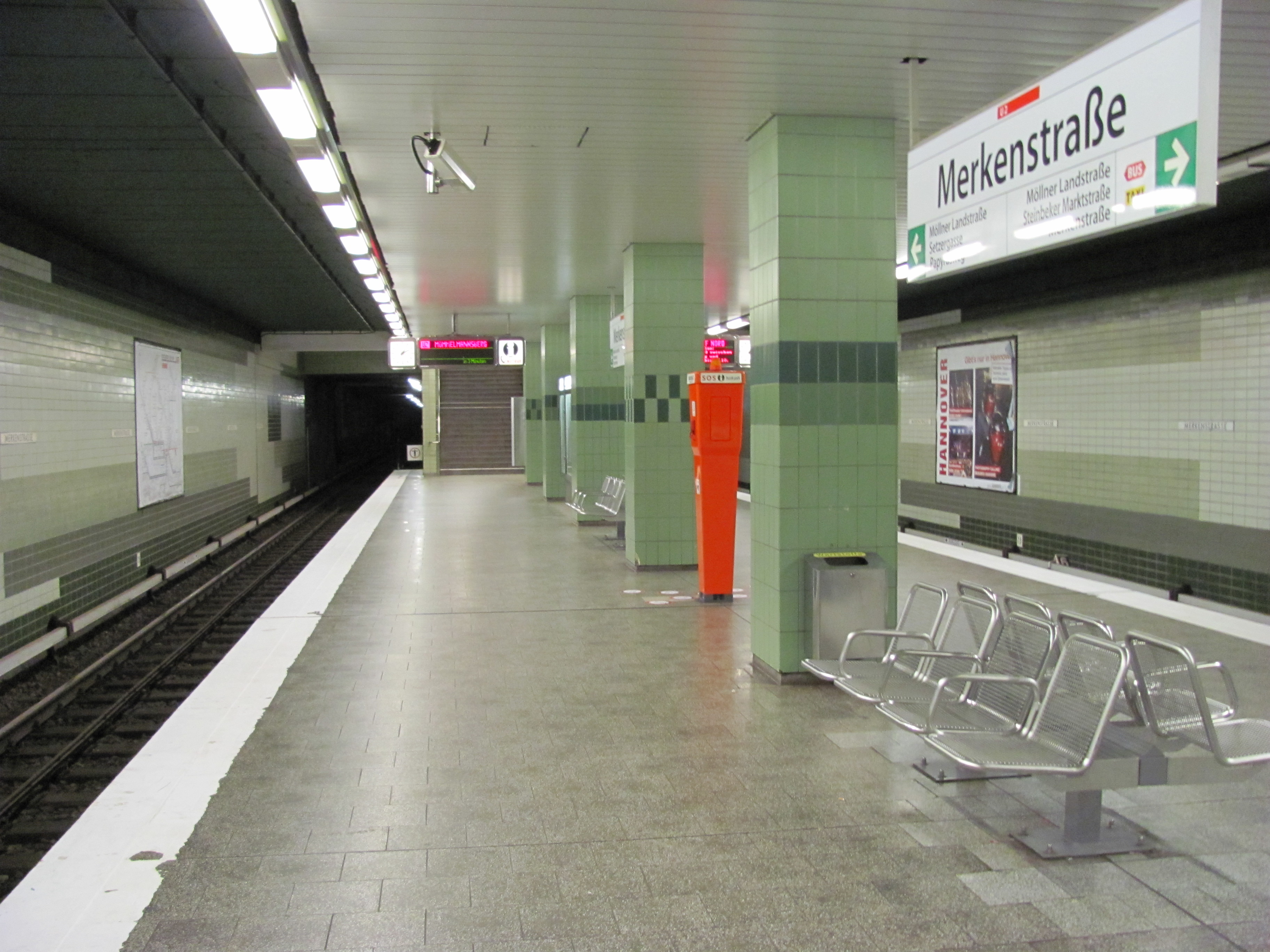

General information
- Location: Möllner Landstraße 141; 22117 Hamburg, Germany
- Coordinates: 53°32′19″N 10°07′26″E
- System: Hamburg U-Bahn station
- Operator: Hamburger Hochbahn AG
- Line: U2
- Platforms: 1 island platform
- Tracks: 2
- Connections: Bus, Taxi

Construction
- Structure type: Underground
- Accessible: Yes

Other information
- Station code: MS
- Fare zone: HVV: A/206

History
- Opened: 31 May 1970

Services
Preceding station	Hamburg U-Bahn	Following station
Billstedt towards Niendorf Nord	U2	Steinfurther Allee towards Mümmelmannsberg
Location
- Location within Hamburg Location within Germany

Merkenstraße is a through station on the Hamburg U-Bahn line U2. The underground rapid transit station is located in the Hamburg district of Billstedt, Germany. Billstedt is part of the borough of Hamburg-Mitte.

The station was opened in 1970, and − until 1990 − was terminus station of line U3.

== Layout ==
Merkenstraße is located on Möllner Landstraße. The station has one island platform, with one entrance each on both ends of the platform.

== Service ==
=== Trains ===
Merkenstraße U-Bahn station is served by Hamburg U-Bahn line U2; departures are every 10 minutes.

== See also ==
- List of Hamburg U-Bahn stations
