= Steinfurther Allee station =

Metro station in Hamburg, Germany

Steinfurther Allee
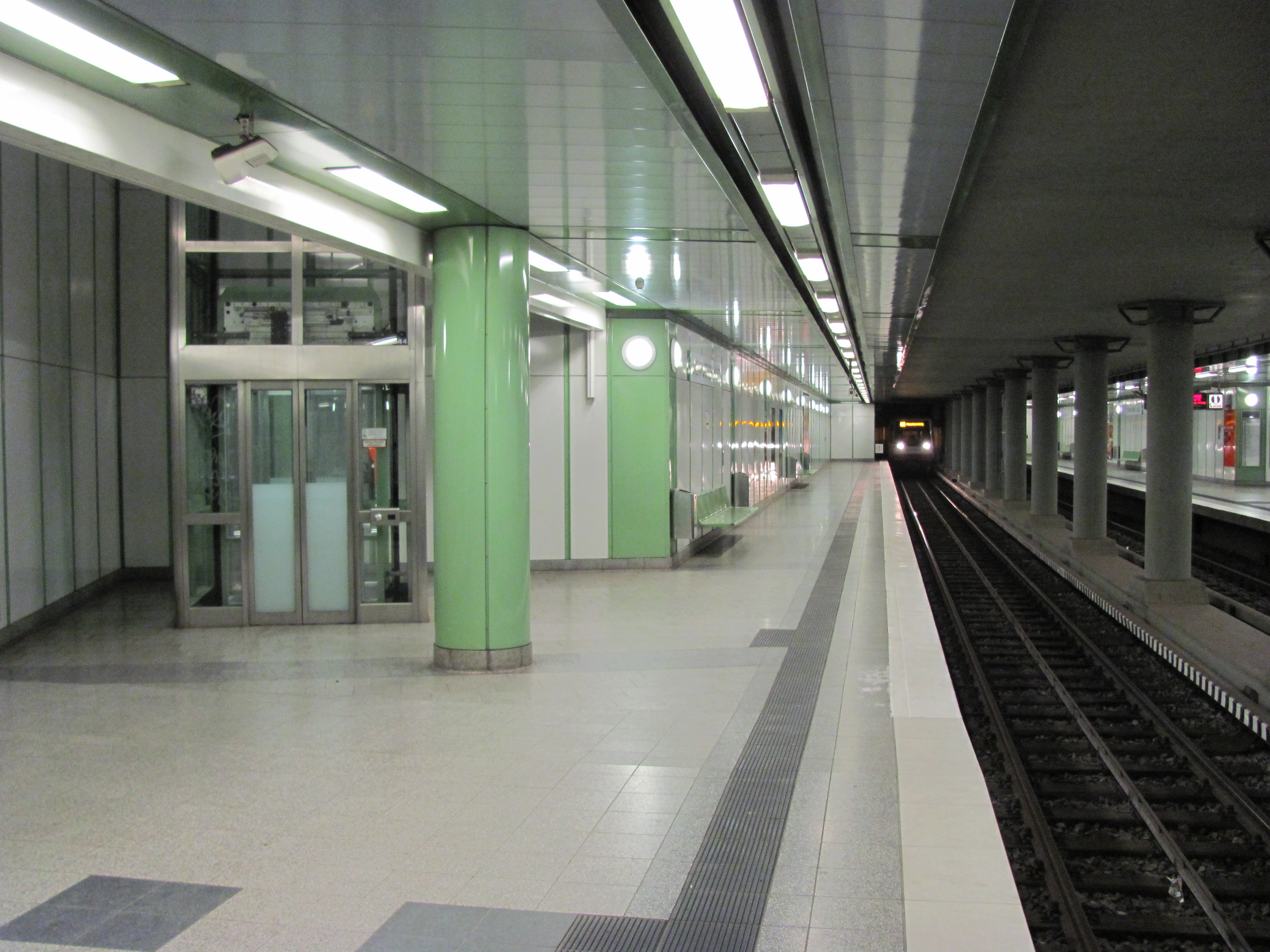

General information
- Location: Steinfurther Allee 1; 22117 Hamburg, Germany
- Coordinates: 53°32′28″N 10°08′21″E
- System: Hamburg U-Bahn station
- Operator: Hamburger Hochbahn AG
- Line: U2
- Platforms: 2 side platforms
- Tracks: 2
- Connections: Bus, Taxi

Construction
- Structure type: Underground
- Parking: Park + Ride (338 slots)
- Accessible: Yes

Other information
- Station code: SF
- Fare zone: HVV: A and B/206 and 306

History
- Opened: 29 September 1990

Services
Preceding station	Hamburg U-Bahn	Following station
Merkenstraße towards Niendorf Nord	U2	Mümmelmannsberg Terminus
Location
- Location within Hamburg Location within Germany

Steinfurther Allee is a through station on the Hamburg U-Bahn line U2. The underground rapid transit station was opened in 1990 and is located in the Hamburg suburb of Billstedt, Germany. Billstedt is part of the borough of Hamburg-Mitte.

== History ==
As with the neighboring Mümmelmannsberg station, Steinfurther Allee station was built between 1987 and 1990. The station was designed by Hamburg architects Kahl + Hoyer. In case of need for civil protection, the station can house up to 1,200 people.

== Layout ==
Steinfurther Allee is a minor street off Möllner Landstraße. The actual station is located east of a Park + Ride parkhouse, which sits between station and the name-giving street. On surface, Steinfurther Allee station accommodates a regional bus station. Below ground, the station's rail tracks and platforms are slightly offset to the layout on surface. The two side platforms have one centrally located exit with stairs, escalators and one elevator each.

== Service ==
=== Trains ===
Steinfurther Allee U-Bahn station is served by Hamburg U-Bahn line U2; departures are every 10 minutes.

=== Bus ===
Steinfurther Allee bus terminal is served by a number of bus operators to connect with neighboring suburbs and municipalities.

== Gallery ==
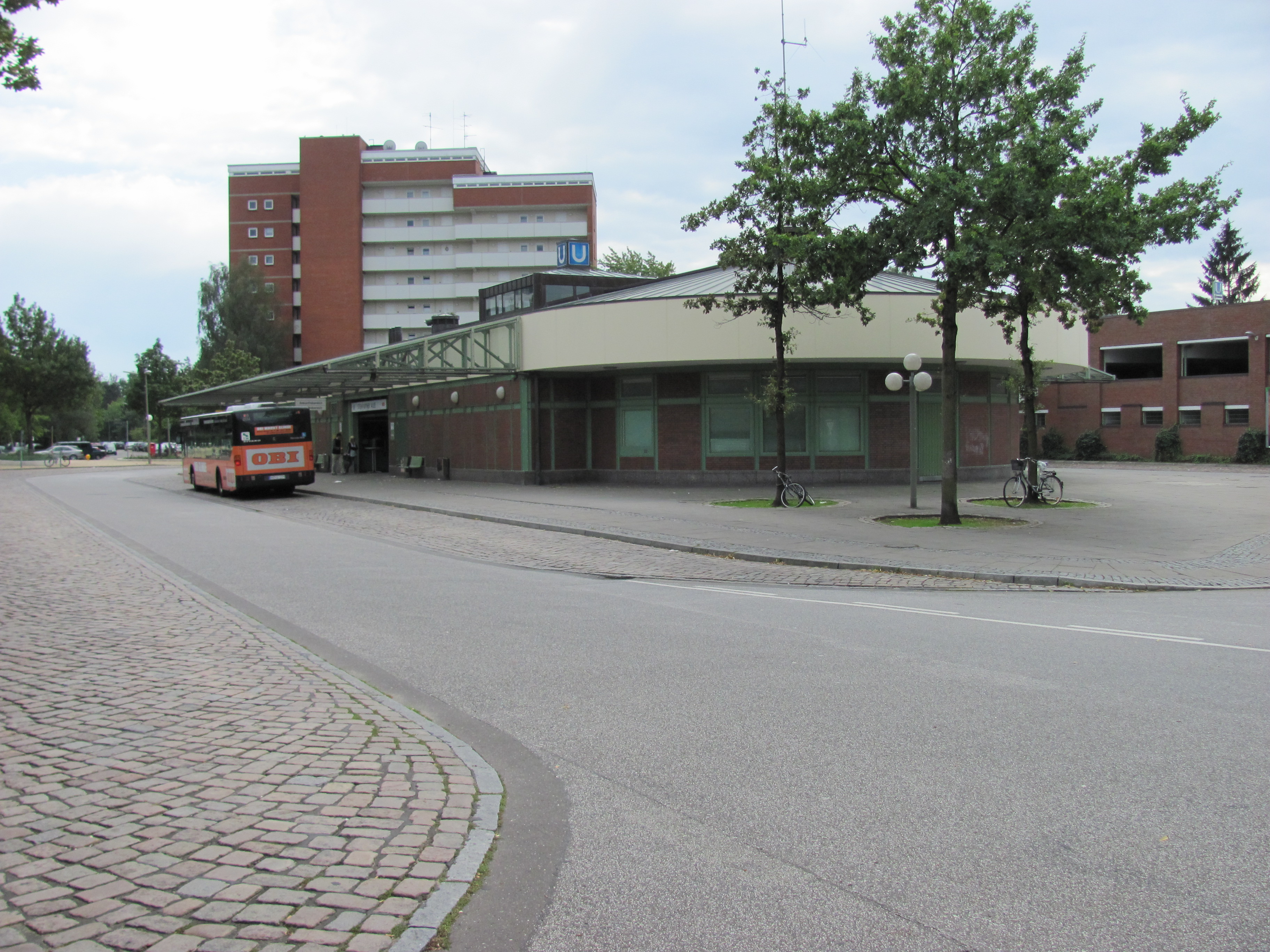
Bus Terminal seen from Möllner Landstraße

== See also ==
- List of Hamburg U-Bahn stations
