= Hagendeel station =

Railway station in Hamburg, Germany

Hagendeel
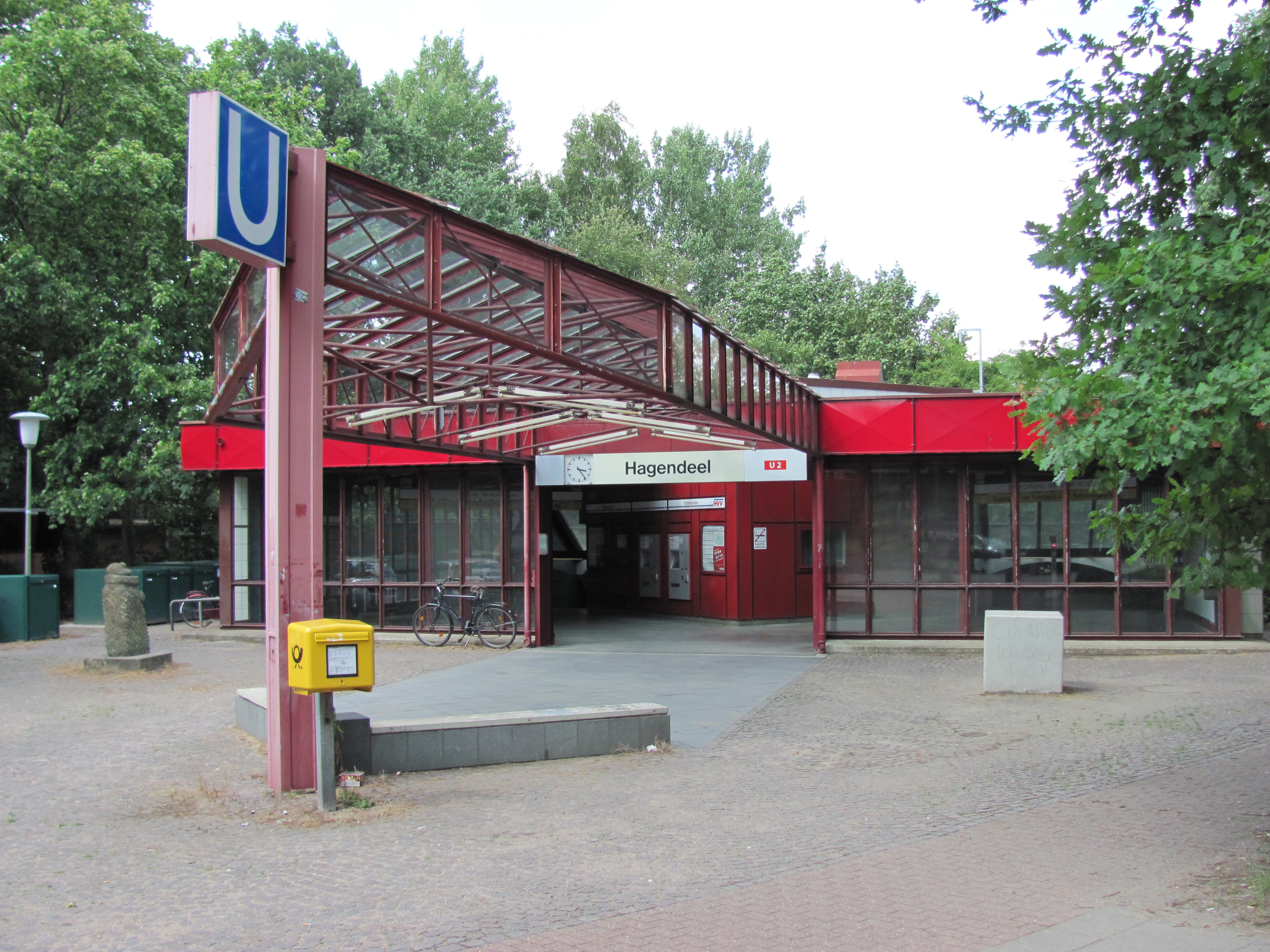
- The entrance to Hagendeel station

General information
- Location: Hinter der Lieth; 22529 Hamburg; Germany
- Coordinates: 53.6042°N 9.9453°E
- System: Hamburg U-Bahn station
- Operator: Hamburger Hochbahn AG
- Line: U2
- Platforms: 2 side platforms
- Tracks: 2
- Connections: Bus

Construction
- Structure type: At grade
- Accessible: Yes

Other information
- Station code: HHA: HL
- Fare zone: HVV: A/203

History
- Opened: 2 June 1985; 41 years ago

Services
Preceding station	Hamburg U-Bahn	Following station
Niendorf Markt towards Niendorf Nord	U2	Hagenbecks Tierpark towards Mümmelmannsberg
Location

Hagendeel is a metro station on the Hamburg U-Bahn line U2.

== History ==
Since 1955, the Hamburg tram system had been scaled back, until 1978, when the last tram line, line 2, to Niendorf ceased operations. In order to replace the tram line, a metro line to Niendorf was required. Since there was no money to finance the cost of building a new line from Stephansplatz to Niendorf via the Grindel quarter, Hoheluft, and Lokstedt, which would have followed the path of the former tram line 2, it was decided that the line to Eimsbüttel (the U2) would be extended instead.

Originally, Hagendeel station was not in the original plans for the Niendorf extension, since the path between the existing terminus, Hagenbecks Tierpark, and Niendorf crossed a sparsely populated area. However, at the request of the Eimsbüttel district council, the Hagendeel stop, originally planned under the working title "Hinter der Lieth" was added as a supplementary stop.

About a year after the end of tram service, construction of the Niendorf extension began on 7 July 1979. In order to cut costs, the extension was supposed to be built aboveground, but ended up being built underground for environmental protection reasons. The cost of construction also influenced how Hagendeel was built, as shown by the fact that the side platforms at the station are narrower than usual.

== Services ==
Hagendeel is served by Hamburg U-Bahn line U2.
