= Schippelsweg station =

Railway station in Hamburg, Germany

Schippelsweg
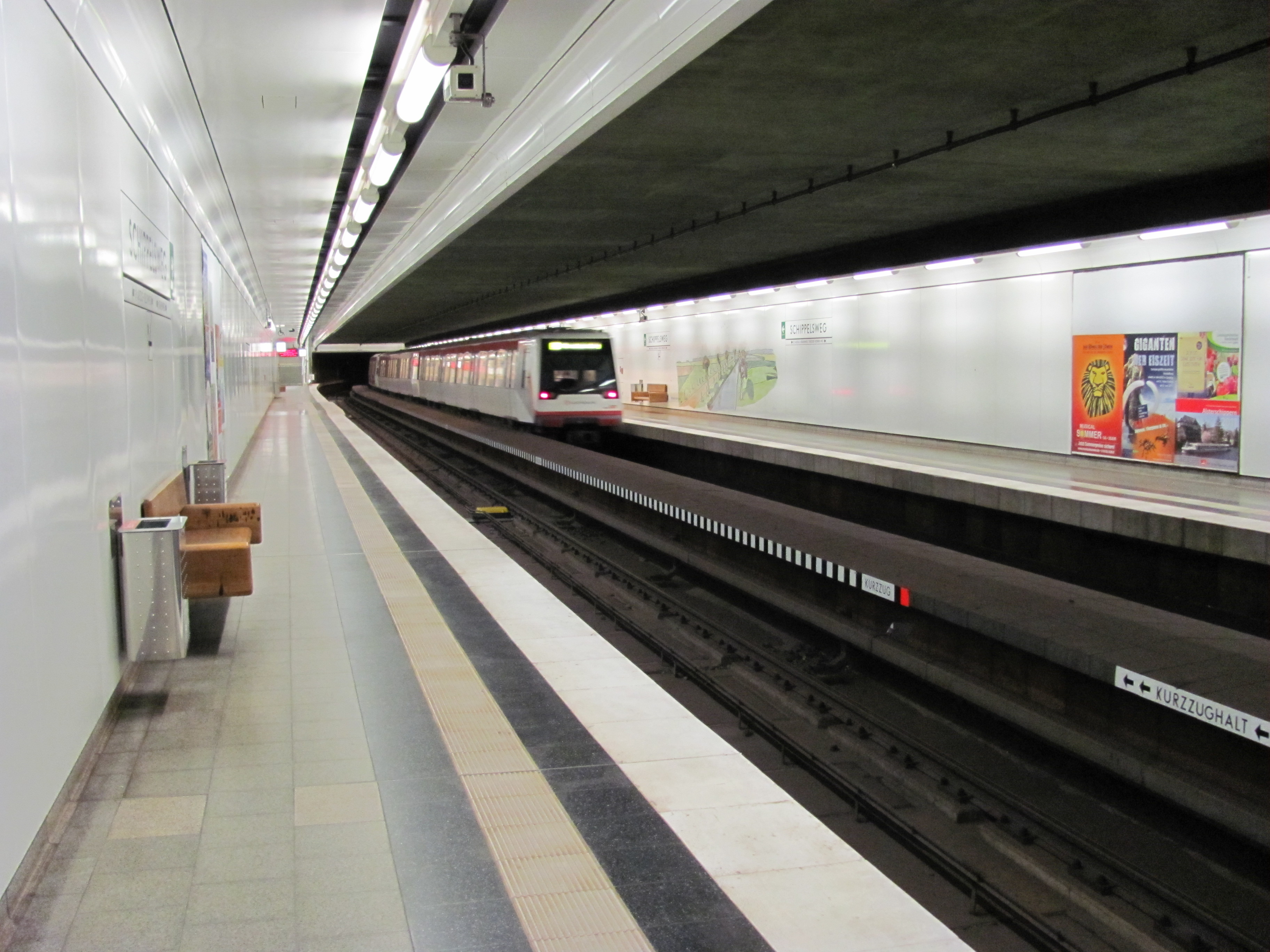
- The platforms at Schippelsweg

General information
- Location: Schippelsweg; 22459 Hamburg; Germany
- Coordinates: 53.6353°N 9.9525°E
- System: Hamburg U-Bahn station
- Operator: Hamburger Hochbahn AG
- Line: U2
- Platforms: 2 side platforms
- Tracks: 2

Construction
- Structure type: At grade
- Accessible: Yes

Other information
- Station code: HHA: SW
- Fare zone: HVV: A/203

History
- Opened: 10 March 1991; 35 years ago

Services
Preceding station	Hamburg U-Bahn	Following station
Niendorf Nord Terminus	U2	Joachim-Mähl-Straße towards Mümmelmannsberg
Location

Schippelsweg is a metro station in Niendorf, Hamburg, on the Hamburg U-Bahn line U2.

== History ==
In 1984, construction began to extend the Hagenbecks Tierpark-Niendorf Markt section of the U2, which opened on 1 June 1985, further to Niendorf Nord. This last section of the U2 was supposed to open in 1987, but complaints from area residents and problems with a high groundwater level made construction four years longer than it was supposed to last.

On 9 March 1991 the extension, and with it Schippelsweg station, was officially opened by the First Mayor of Hamburg, Henning Voscherau, with senators Wilhelm Rahlfs and Eugen Wagner in attendance.

== Services ==
Schippelsweg is served by Hamburg U-Bahn line U2.
