= Öjendorfer See =

Lake in Hamburg, Germany

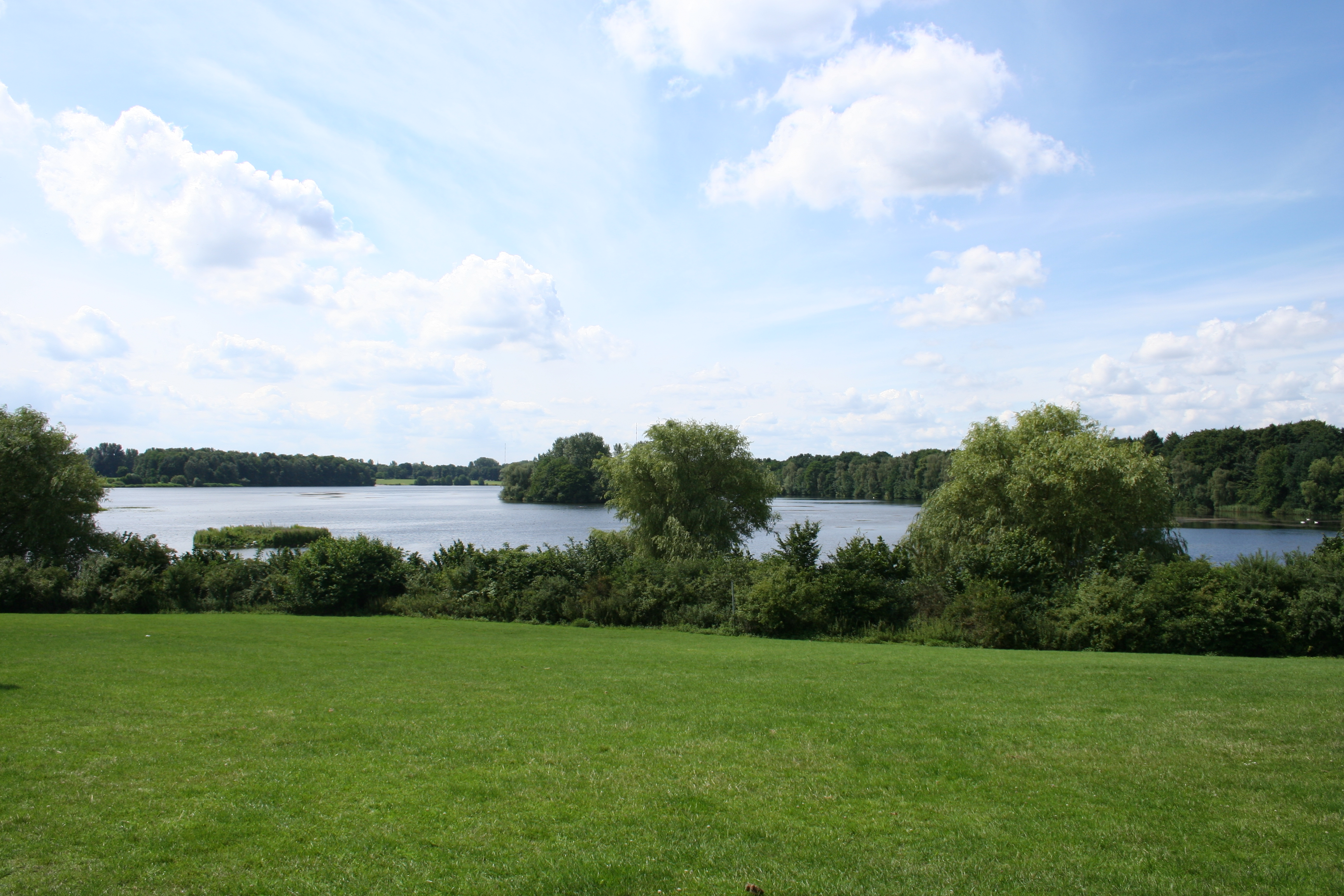

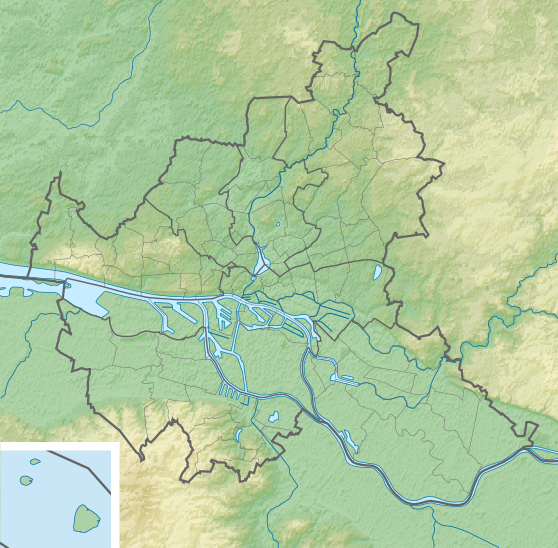
- Location within Hamburg
- Location: Billstedt (Öjendorf), Hamburg
- Coordinates: 53°33′30″N 10°08′20″E
- Primary inflows: Schleemer Bach
- Basin countries: Germany
- Max. length: 1,328 m (4,357 ft)
- Max. width: 507 m (1,663 ft)
- Surface area: 460,000 m^{2} (5,000,000 sq ft)
- Average depth: 1.8 m (5 ft 11 in)
- Max. depth: 3.4 m (11 ft)
- Water volume: 17,474 m^{3} (617,100 cu ft)

Öjendorfer See is a lake in Billstedt (Öjendorf), Hamburg, Germany. Its surface area is 460,000 m^{2}.
