= Mümmelmannsberg =

- Part of Hamburg
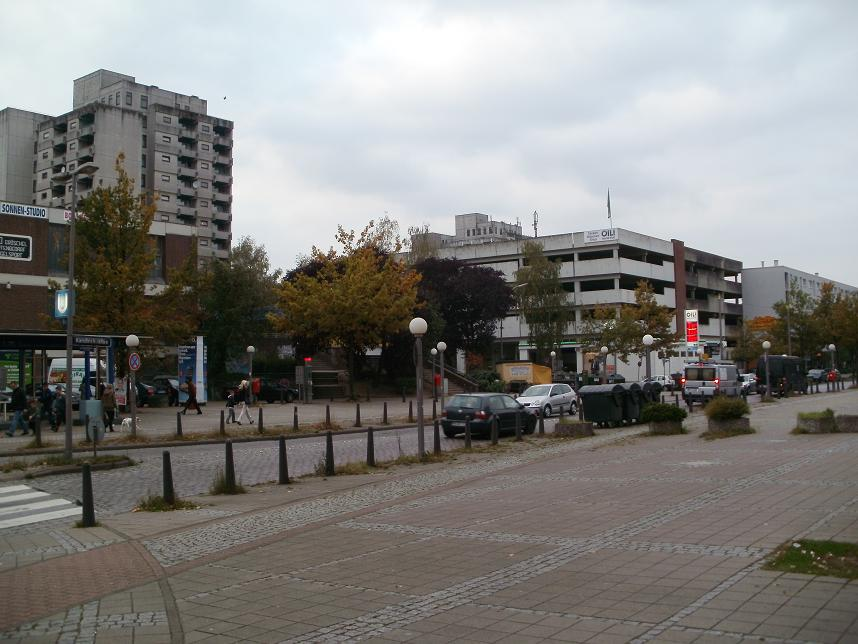
- Interactive map of Mümmelmannsberg
- Location within Germany Location within Hamburg
- Coordinates: 53°31′39″N 10°9′0″E
- Country: Germany
- State: Hamburg
- City: Hamburg
- Borough: Hamburg-Mitte

Population (2014)
  - Total: 17,980
- Time zone: UTC+01:00 (CET)
  - Summer (DST): UTC+02:00 (CEST)
- Dialling codes: 040
- Vehicle registration: HH

Mümmelmannsberg is a place and major housing estate in Hamburg, Germany in the quarter of Billstedt. It was named after the street with the same name which already existed before Mümmelmannsberg was built.

== Geography ==
Mümmelmannsberg is located in the east of Billstedt which is a part of the borough Mitte. It borders Hamburg-Lohbrügge and Oststeinbek in Schleswig-Holstein. The postal code is 22115.

== History ==
The housing complex was built between 1970 and 1979. Today Mümmelmannsberg is also called “Mümmelberg", "M-Town", "Mümmeltown" or most commonly "Mümmel".

Since 1990 Mümmelmannsberg has a U-Bahn station with the same name.

In April 2006 Mümmelmannsberg got nationwide recognition for a ZDF documentary. The German TV channel paid teenagers for recreating violent scenes about attacks and burglary. This was supposed to teach the audience about ghettos in cities. This incident got a big backlash for criminalizing innocent teenagers in Mümmemannsberg because of fictive acts. The place's image got worse and millennials complained about finding a job harder after the documentary was aired.

The foreign population is about 23% (the entire district about 47%) and an above-average number of welfare recipients lives in Mümmelmannsberg.
