= Tierpark Hagenbeck =

German zoo

Tierpark Hagenbeck Hagenbeck's Animal Park

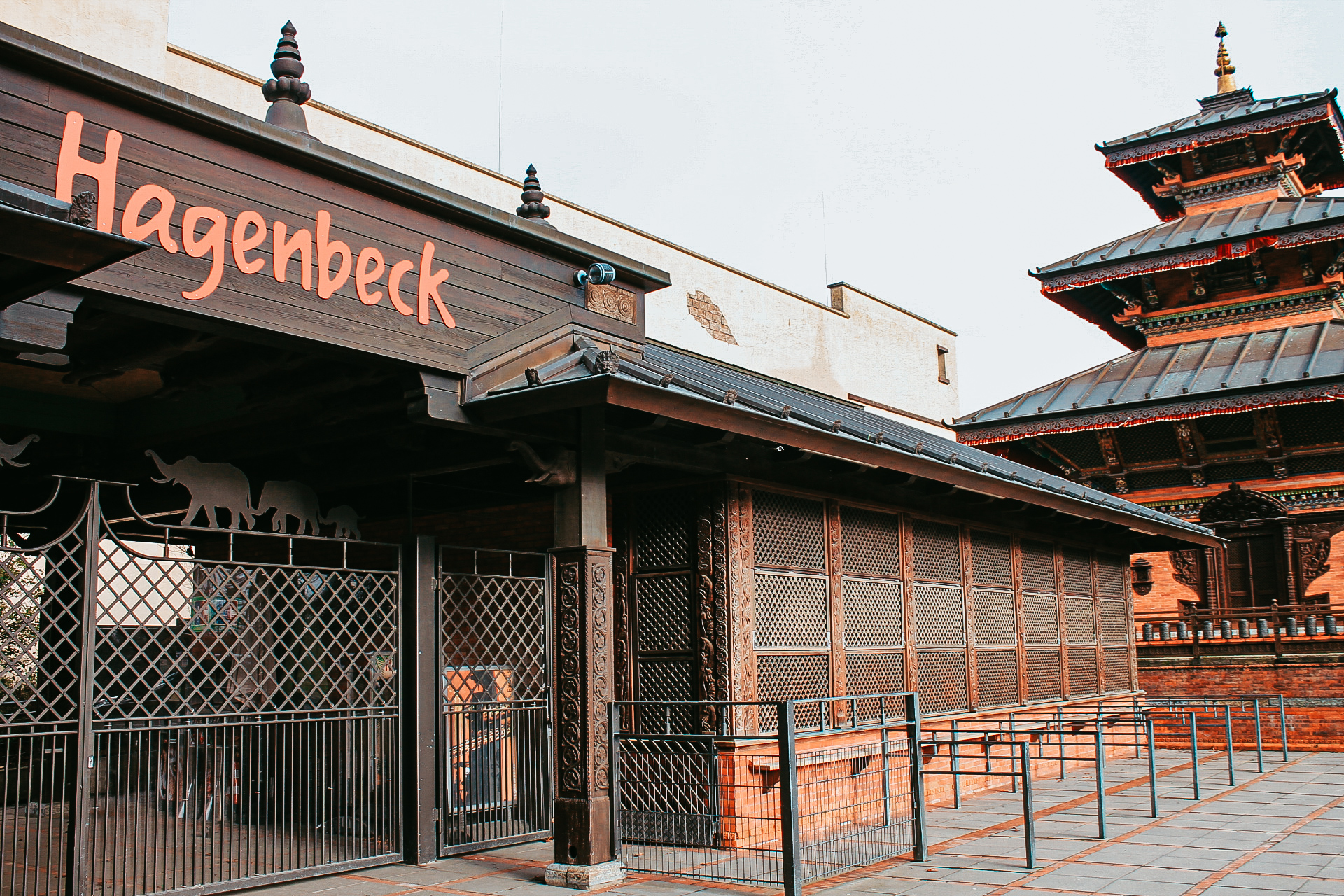
- Zoo entrance by the tropical aquarium
- Interactive map of Tierpark Hagenbeck; Hagenbeck's Animal Park
- 53°35′47″N 9°56′16″E
- Date opened: 7 May 1907
- Location: Lokstedter Grenzstraße 2; 22527 Hamburg, Germany
- Land area: 25 ha (62 acres)
- No. of animals: 14.300
- No. of species: 530
- Owner: Tierpark Hagenbeck GmbH
- Public transit: Hagenbecks Tierpark
- Website: www.hagenbeck.de

The Tierpark Hagenbeck is a zoo in Stellingen, Hamburg, Germany. The collection began in 1863 with animals that belonged to Carl Hagenbeck Sr. (1810–1887), a fishmonger who became an amateur animal collector. The park itself was founded by Carl Hagenbeck Jr. in 1907. It is known for being the first zoo to use open enclosures surrounded by moats, rather than barred cages, to better approximate animals' natural environments.

== History ==
=== Animal and human trading ===
In 1863, the elder Hagenbeck began collecting exotic animals that came through Hamburg's port. By the 1870s, the trade had proved more lucrative than his fish shop, and Hagenbeck had become one of the most prominent exotic animal traders in all of Europe. In 1874, the younger Hagenbeck traveled around the world collecting animals. Among his collections, however, were also human beings whom he exhibited in "human zoos". Hagenbeck decided to exhibit Samoan and Sámi people as "purely natural" populations. The Sámi were presented with their tents, weapons, and sleds, beside a group of reindeer.

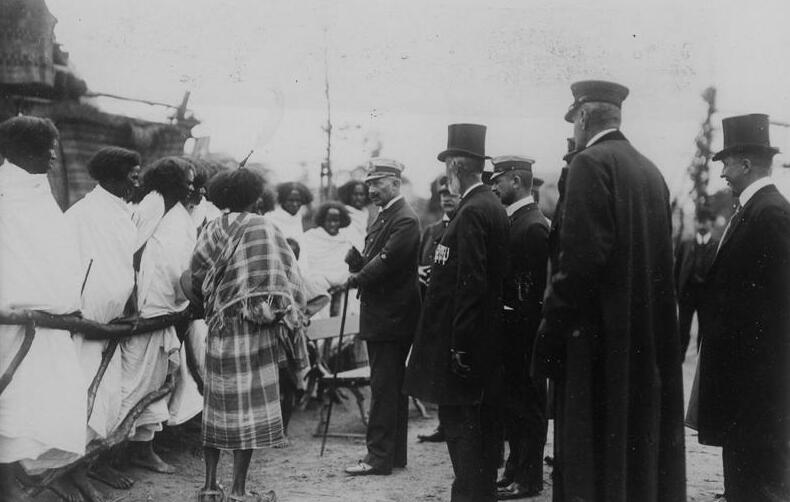
Wilhelm II, German Emperor during a visit on 1909, speaking with human exhibitions

In 1874, Hagenbeck opened a zoo facility in Hamburg, called Carl Hagenbeck's Tierpark, while he continued exhibiting humans. In 1876, he began exhibiting Nubians all across Europe. He also dispatched an agent to Labrador to secure a number of "Esquimaux" (Inuit) from the settlement of Hebron; these Inuit (see Abraham Ulrikab) were exhibited in the Hamburg Tierpark.

Though initially popular, Hagenbeck's shows gradually began to decline in popularity, especially once the photograph became more and more common, and Hagenbeck's exhibits began to look less and less real in comparison. After one exhibit, Hagenbeck was left with a large number of elephants and no one to purchase them. Unable to sell, he started a circus. To counter the declining popularity of his human zoos, Hagenbeck began working on making his displays more realistic, techniques that would later influence the animal zoo.

=== Panorama exhibits ===
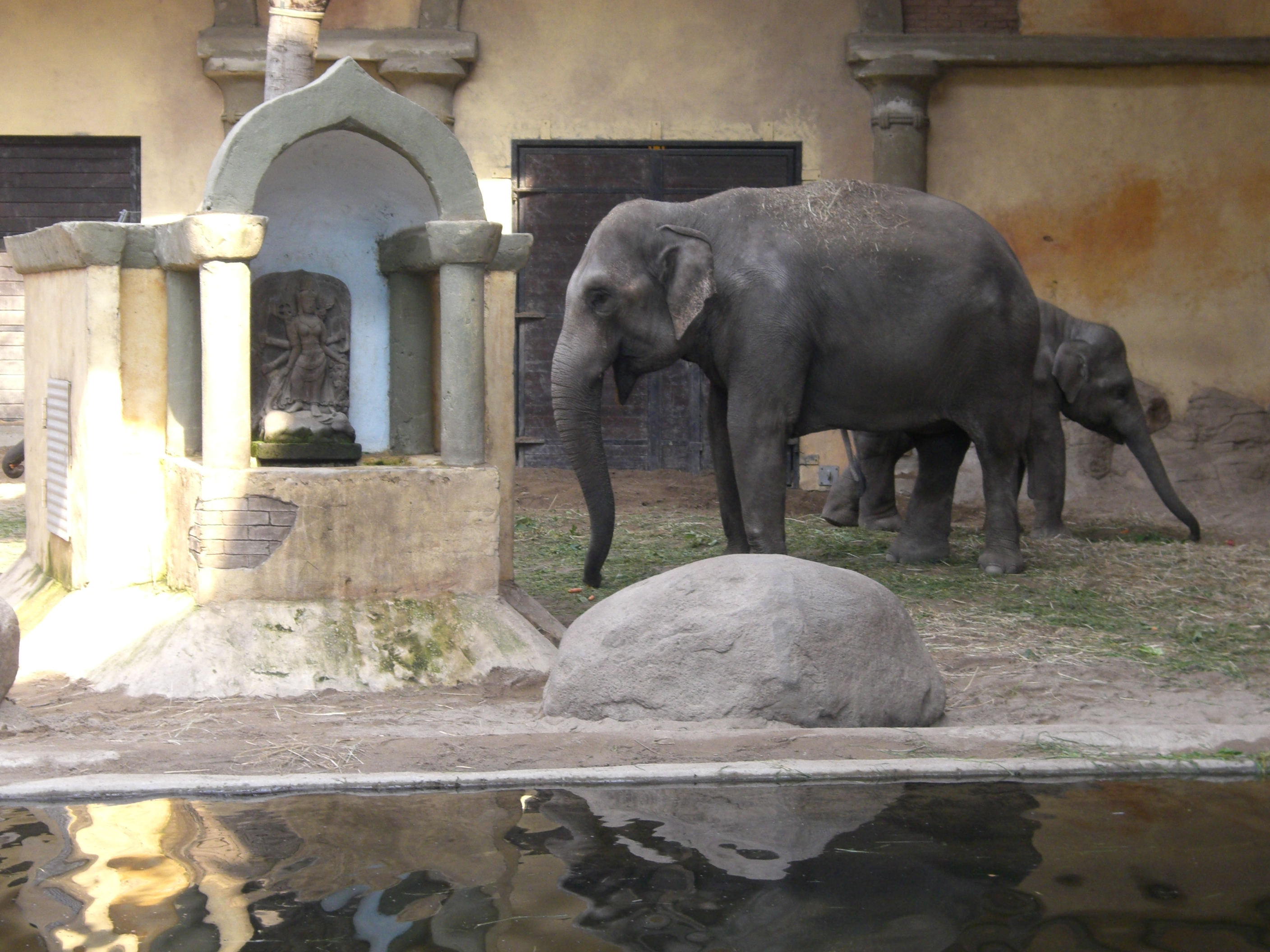
The Tierpark Hagenbeck was the first zoo to separate its animals from zoo visitors using moats instead of bars.

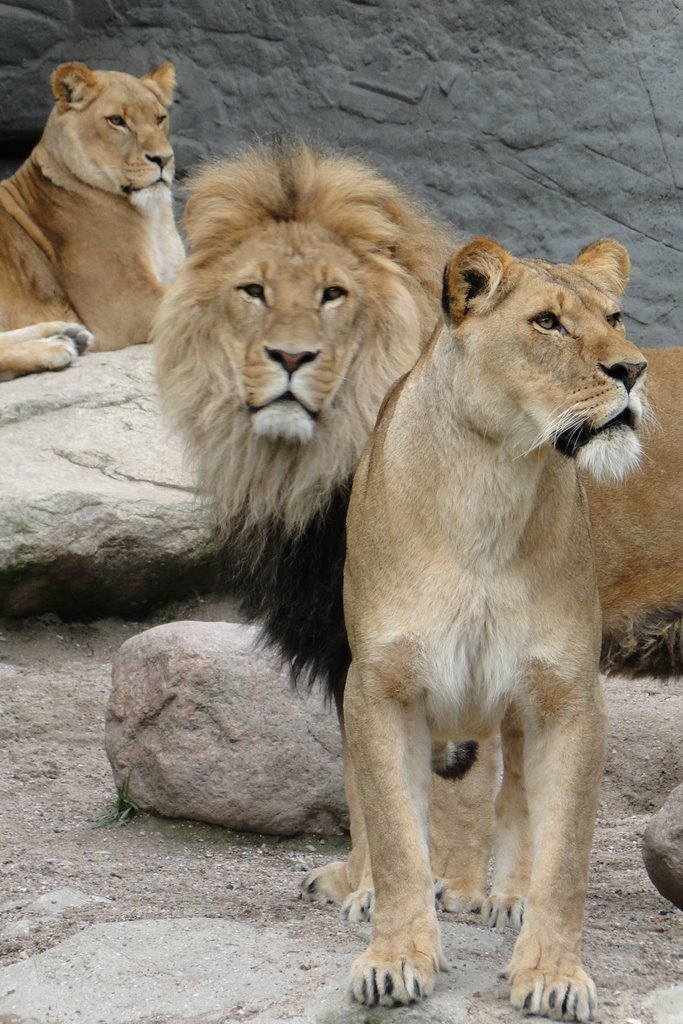
Lions in Hagenbeck Zoo

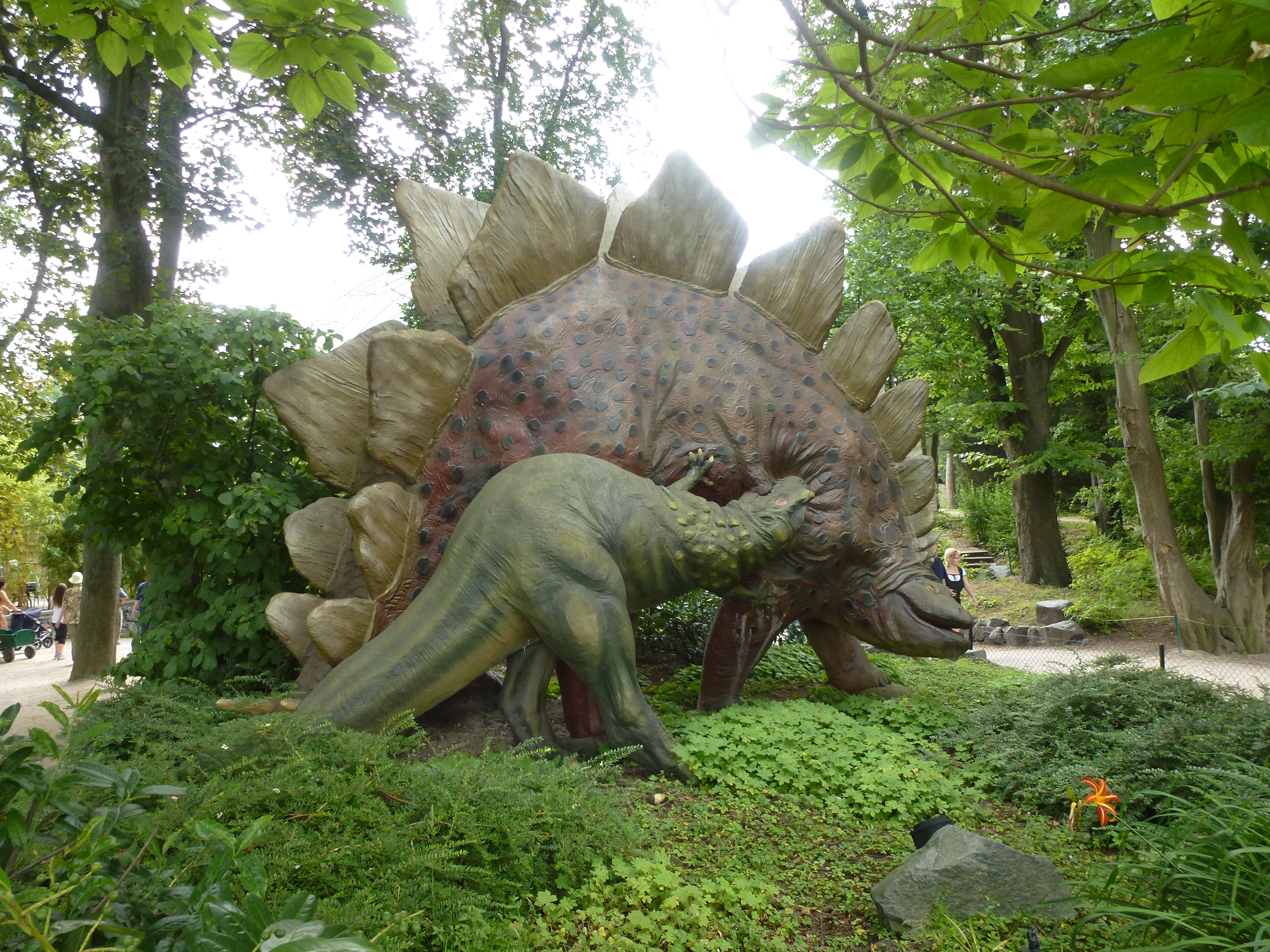
Sculptures of Ceratosaurus and Stegosaurus by Josef Pallenberg

In the 1890s Hagenbeck created his first "panorama" exhibit and patented the idea in 1896. The display was the "Northern Panorama", the foreground featured seals and walruses in a pool. Hidden from the zoo's patrons was a moat behind the pool. Beyond the moat were reindeer, and beyond a second hidden moat were polar bears. By hiding the moats, the animals appeared to be together in one landscape.

In 1907, Hagenbeck constructed a new facility outside of Hamburg which he called Tierpark Hagenbeck (without the 'H' that was in Thierpark) which is still the location of the facility today. Hagenbeck sought to design the entire zoo with his panorama system. He also sought to demonstrate that animals from warmer climates did not need to live in expensive, humid, foreboding buildings. Instead, Hagenbeck again sought to make his displays realistic.

Using data that he had compiled running his circus, Hagenbeck had estimates of how high and far different animals could leap. Using this data, he built moats filled with water or an empty pit that he determined the animals could not cross. Using moats to separate animals that did not swim, one could look across an expanse of the zoo and see many animals at once, as if in the wild. Previously, zoos had not grouped animals by species, but Hagenbeck revolutionized the layout of zoos, grouping his animals by species. Hagenbeck's design was a popular success. In 1911, Hagenbeck designed the Rome Zoo in the same style. In 1913, he designed the first monkey-rock exhibit, in this case an artificial crag with a 16-foot (4.9 m) moat. The rock was populated by around 200 hamadryas baboons.

Hagenbeck called his design an animal paradise where "animals would live beside each other in harmony and where the fight for survival would be eliminated."

The zoo also includes a number of life-sized sculptures of dinosaurs by Josef Pallenberg, who also sculpted the gates at the zoo's original entrance.

=== World War I and II ===
Hagenbeck died in 1913, but his zoo remained popular until the political situation in Europe swept the zoo into hard times. During World War I many of the keepers were drafted into the German army. Because the military had taken horses from civilians for use at the front, many of Hagenbeck's animals were rented out for use as draught animals for hauling coal and wood on home deliveries. It was not unusual to see elephants and trained bears hitched up to heavy wagons. After the war, the zoo closed for two years as Germany entered into a deep depression. Then during the Bombing of Hamburg in World War II the original zoo was destroyed. After the war the zoo was rebuilt. The private zoo is still run by the Hagenbeck family.

=== Monkey escape ===
In July 1956, forty five rhesus monkeys escaped from the zoo and ran wild in Hamburg. The incident resulted in calls for help from shocked housewives who met monkeys in their bedrooms and bathtubs. Some of the monkeys sat in trees and chattered excitedly, showing each other toothpaste, soap bars and bathroom utensils which they had grabbed. Managers of the zoo reported that more than two dozen of the long-tailed Indian monkeys had been caught by policemen, firemen, zoo keepers and schoolchildren.

=== Antje the walrus ===
In 1976, the zoo acquired a female Pacific walrus which Hagenbeck named Antje after his sister. Antje became the logo of the north German television network NDR from 1983 to 1996. In 2003, Antje died and is now stuffed and on display at the Zoological Museum of Hamburg. Soon after, the children's cartoon "Antje, Tiger und Bär" aired on German television featuring a blue walrus protagonist based on Antje and designed by children's author Janosch. In 2013, Tierpark Hagenbeck gained a male and three female walruses from Moscow.

== Sala Thai ==
Sala Thai

Inside the park lies the Sala Thai (official name: Sala Thai Chaloem Phra Kiat; Thai: ศาลาไทยเฉลิมพระเกียรติ; lit. 'Thai pavilion of royal celebration'), a Thai traditional pavilion designed by Thai National Artist Pinyo Suwankiri. It was built in Thailand over the period of 5 months before it was knocked-down, shipped to Germany, and reassembled on-site by 20 craftsmen from Thailand in under two months. Claimed to be the largest of its kind in Europe, it was gifted in 2002 by the Thai government to celebrate the 72 year anniversary of King Bhumibol's birth as well as the relationship between the two countries. Suwankiri designed the pavilion using traditional joinery technique without a single nail.
