= Stellingen =

- Quarter of Hamburg
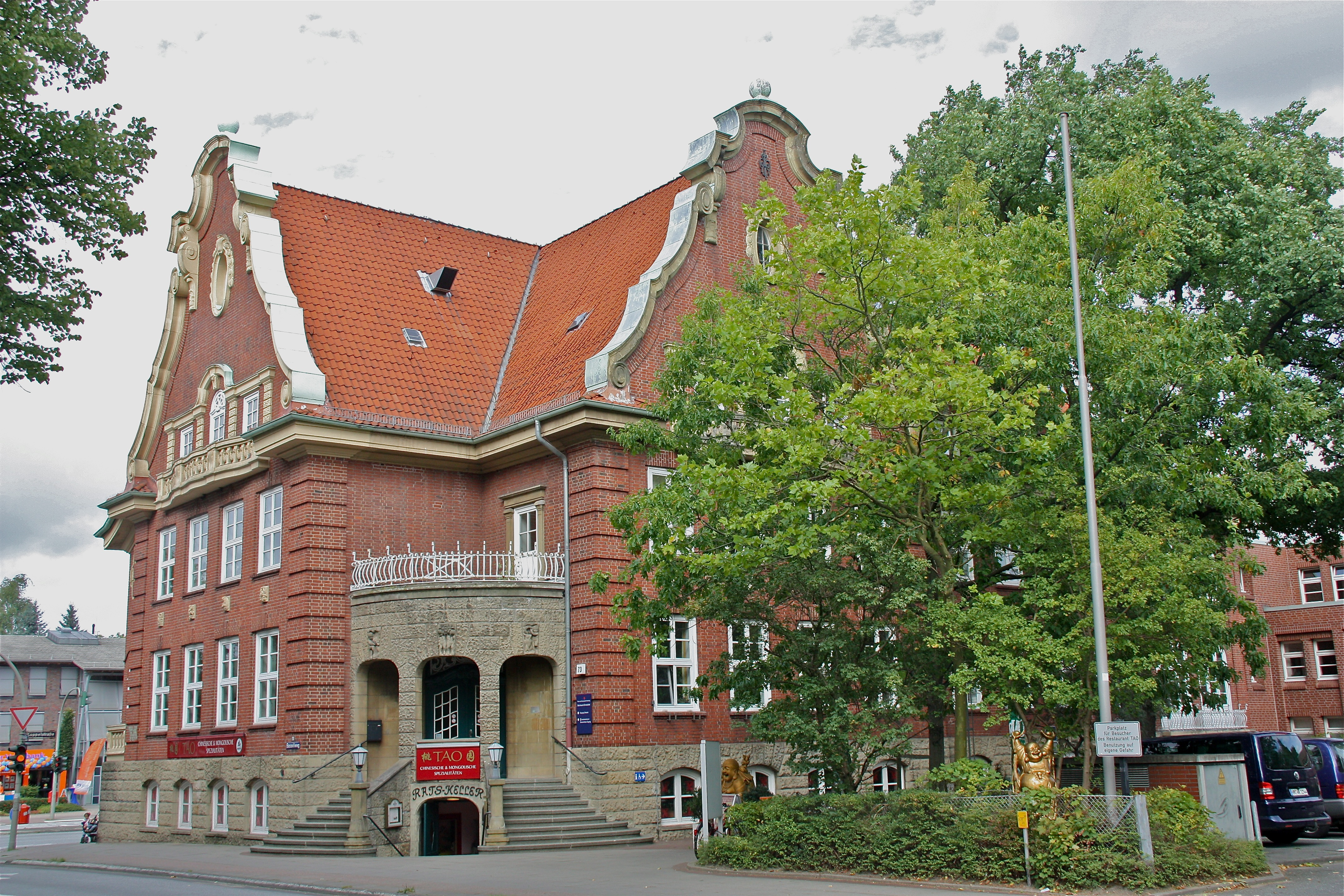
- Town hall

- Location of Stellingen in Hamburg
- Interactive map of Stellingen
- Location within Germany Location within Hamburg
- Coordinates: 53°35′32″N 9°55′43″E
- Country: Germany
- State: Hamburg
- City: Hamburg
- Borough: Eimsbüttel

Area
  - Total: 5.8 km^{2} (2.2 sq mi)

Population (2024-12-31)
  - Total: 28,812
  - Density: 5,000/km^{2} (13,000/sq mi)
- Time zone: UTC+01:00 (CET)
  - Summer (DST): UTC+02:00 (CEST)
- Dialling codes: 040
- Vehicle registration: HH

Stellingen (German pronunciation: [ˈʃtɛlɪŋən]) is a quarter of Hamburg, Germany, in the borough of Eimsbüttel. In 2024 it had a population of 28,812. Stellingen district also includes Langenfelde.

== History ==
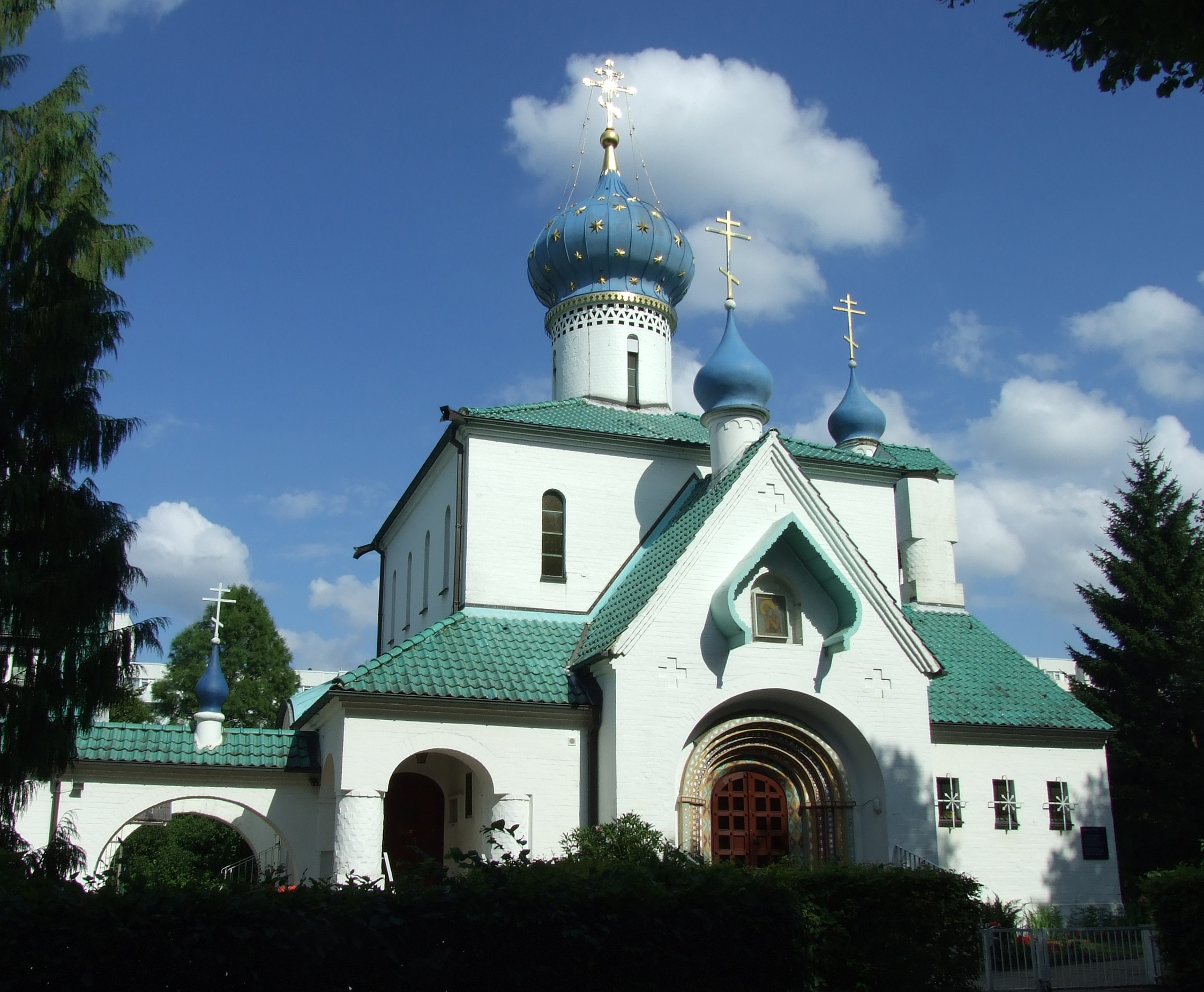
Orthodox Church St. Prokop

The name probably derives from the Old Germanic personal name Stallo, though another interpretation links it to the Frisian word for a judicial seat. The area was first mentioned in 1347. It came under Danish rule in the 17th century and later became part of Prussia after the Second Schleswig War in 1867. In 1927 Stellingen was incorporated into the city of Altona, and with the Greater Hamburg Act of 1937 it became part of Hamburg. Since 1951, it has belonged to the borough of Eimsbüttel.

In 1907 the well-known Hagenbeck Zoo opened in Stellingen. During World War II large parts of Langenfelde were destroyed (ca. 38 percent). Today the quarter is shaped by major traffic routes, including the A7 motorway. As part of a "district repair," the "Hamburger Deckel" was built to cover the motorway over a length of 900 meters across the section from the Stellingen junction to the northern freight bypass. It was covered with greenery to create a park.

== Landmarks ==
- Hagenbeck Zoo, one of Hamburg’s most famous attractions
- Stellinger Water Tower (1912)
- Fazl-e-Omar Mosque (1957), the first mosque built in Germany after World War II
- Russian Orthodox Church of St. Procopius

== Transport ==
Stellingen is served by the Hamburg S-Bahn (lines S3 and S5) and the U2 underground line at Hagenbecks Tierpark station. The A7 motorway runs through the quarter.

== Notable people ==
- Hans Henny Jahnn (1894–1959), writer and organ builder
- Olli Schulz (b. 1973), singer-songwriter and actor
