= Niendorf, Hamburg =

Niendorf
- Quarter of Hamburg
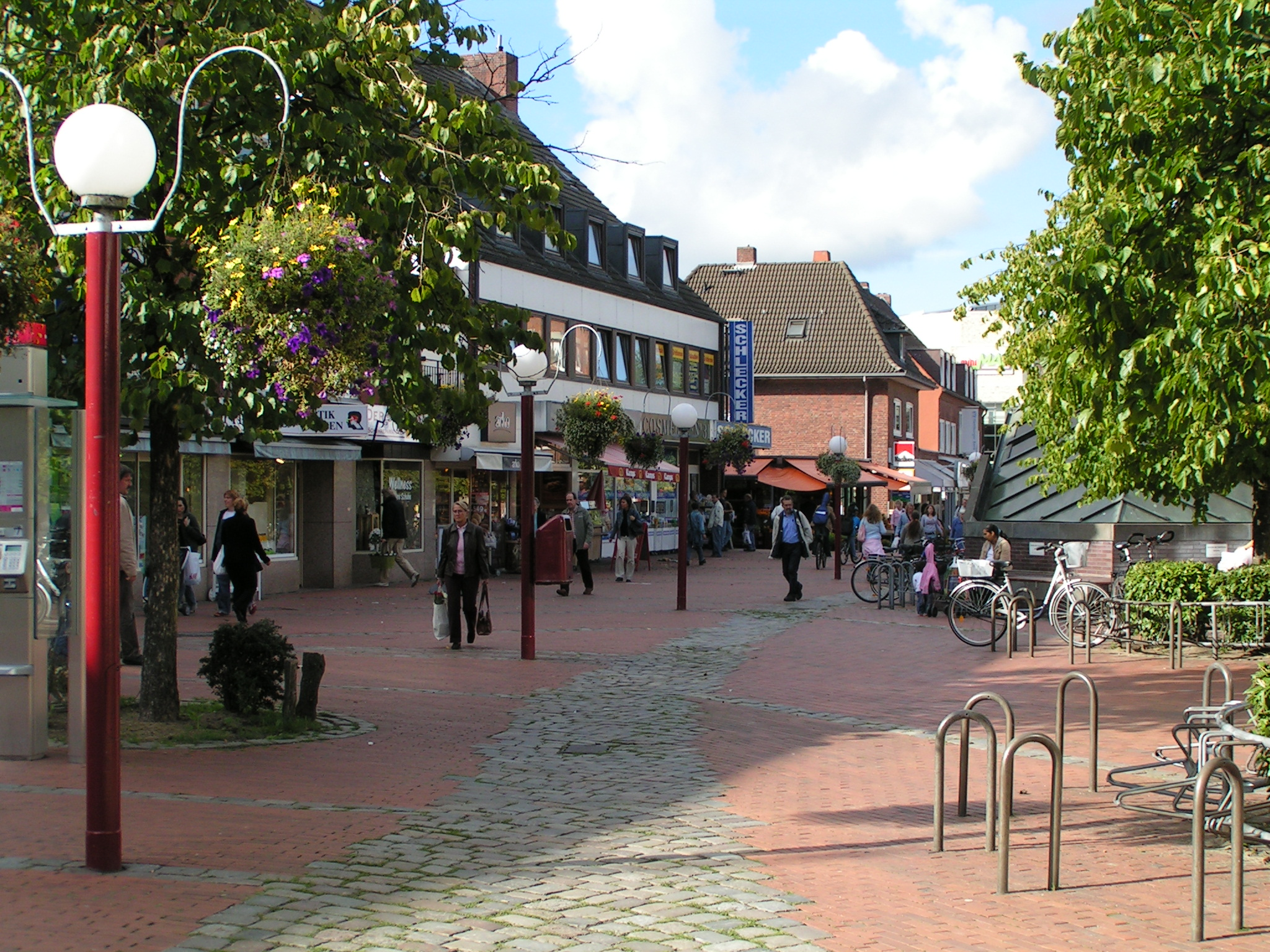
- Niendorf market area (pedestrian zone)

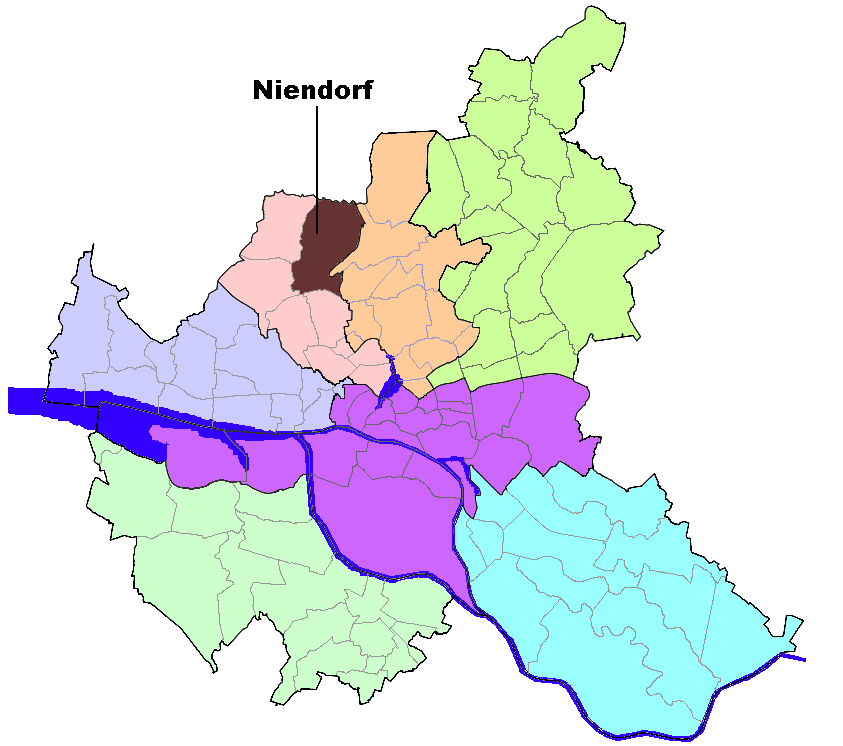
- Location of Niendorf in Hamburg
- Interactive map of Niendorf
- Location within Germany Location within Hamburg
- Coordinates: 53°37′04″N 9°57′01″E
- Country: Germany
- State: Hamburg
- City: Hamburg
- Borough: Eimsbüttel

Area
  - Total: 12.7 km^{2} (4.9 sq mi)

Population (2024-12-31)
  - Total: 42,496
  - Density: 3,350/km^{2} (8,670/sq mi)
- Time zone: UTC+01:00 (CET)
  - Summer (DST): UTC+02:00 (CEST)
- Dialling codes: 040
- Vehicle registration: HH

Niendorf (German pronunciation: [ˈniːndɔʁf]) is one of 105 quarters of Hamburg, Germany in the Eimsbüttel borough. In December 2023, Niendorf had a population of 42,332.

== Geography ==
According to the statistical office of Hamburg and Schleswig-Holstein, the quarter has a total area of 12.7 km².

== Demographics ==
In 2006, Niendorf had a population of 39,690. The census recorded that 15.2% of the population were children under the age of 18, 24.8% were 65 years of age or older, and 6.9% were immigrants. Additionally, 1,140 people were registered as unemployed.

In 1999, there were 20,092 households and 40.5% of all households were made up of individuals.

== Education ==
There were 5 elementary schools and 4 secondary schools in Niendorf, including the Gymnasium Ohmoor. The public secondary school Gymnasium Ohmoor participates in the U.S. Congress - Bundestag Youth Exchange Program. The exchange program provides 250 full scholarships for American high school students, letting them "gain real world views of current affairs and German social, political and economic life." Other secondary schools include the Gymnasium Bondenwald and the Stadteilschule Niendorf.

== Infrastructure ==
=== Health systems ===
In 2006, there were 71 physicians in private practice and 10 pharmacies were counted.

=== Transportation ===
Public transport is provided by the Hamburger Verkehrsverbund with several stations of the underground railway and bus lines. The Niendorf Nord railway station is the terminus of the line U2.

The Bundesstrasse 447 passes the quarter connecting the Bundesstrasse 5 with the Bundesautobahn 7. According to the Department of Motor Vehicles (Kraftfahrt-Bundesamt), 18,046 private cars were registered (454 cars/1000 people) in Niendorf.
