= Billstedt =

- Quarter of Hamburg
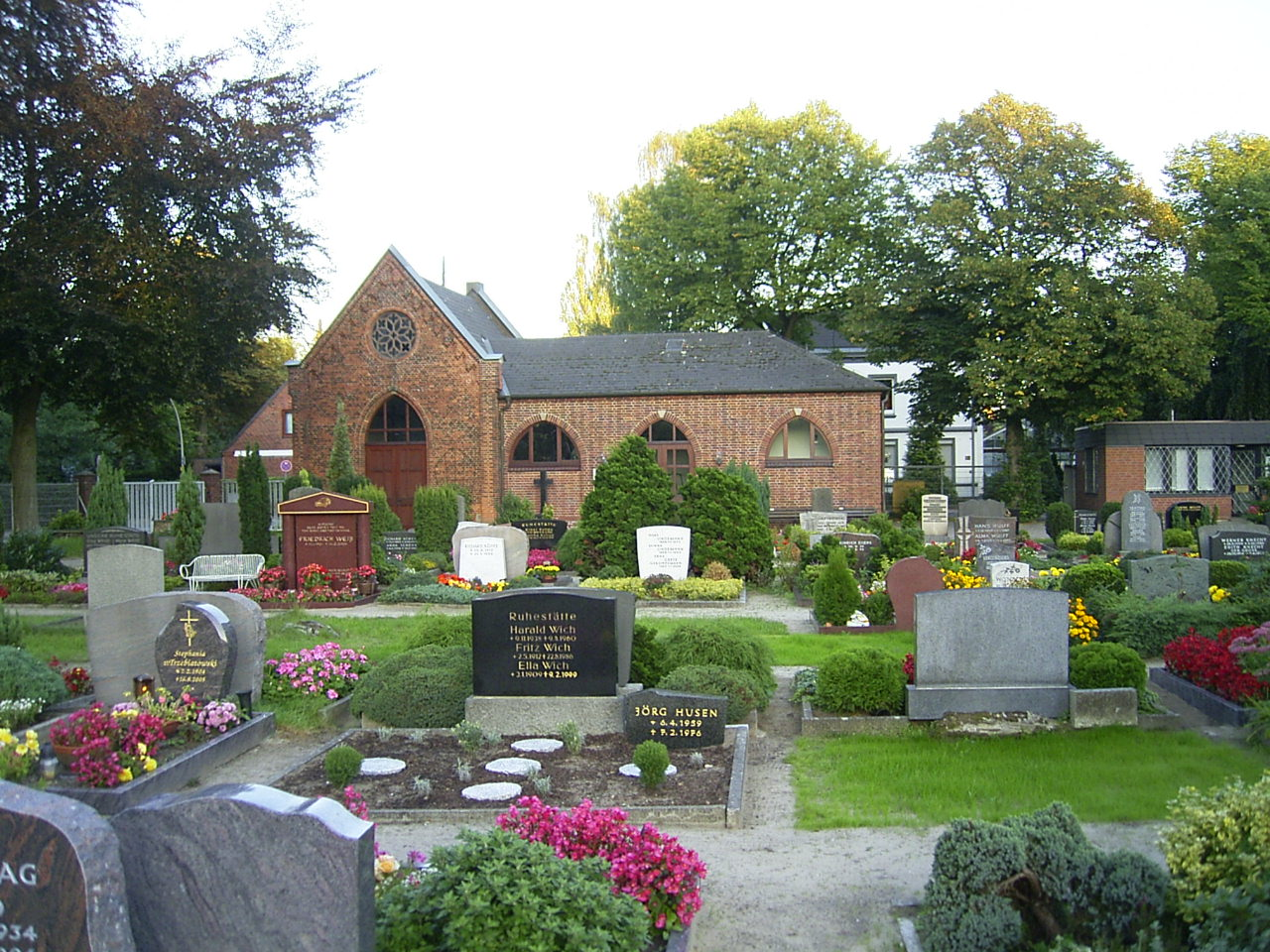
- Cemetery in the locality Kirchsteinbek.

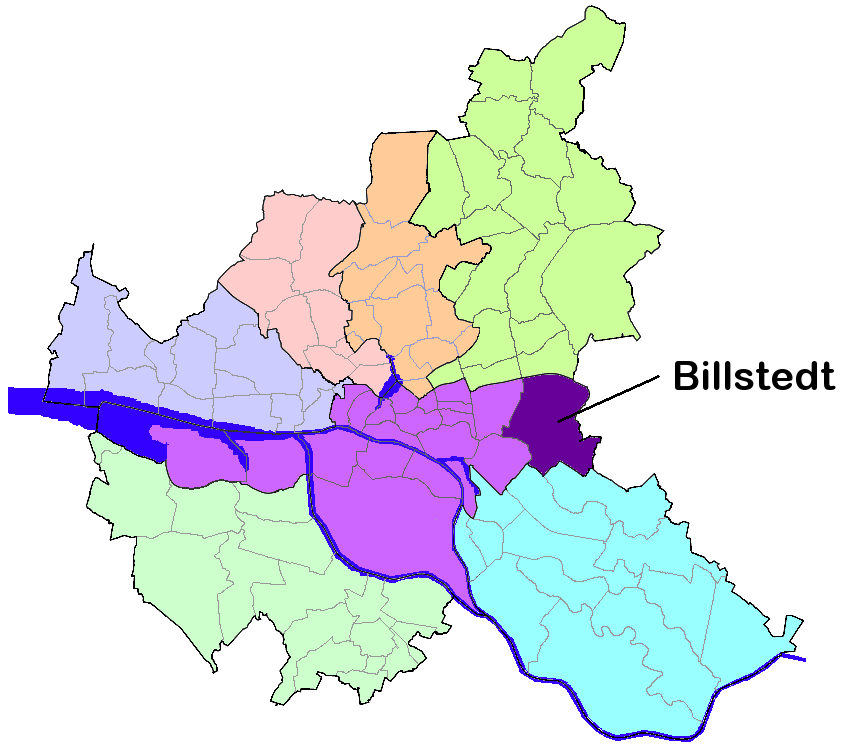
- Location of Billstedt in Hamburg
- Interactive map of Billstedt
- Location within Germany Location within Hamburg
- Coordinates: 53°32′26″N 10°6′0″E
- Country: Germany
- State: Hamburg
- City: Hamburg
- Borough: Hamburg-Mitte

Area
  - Total: 17 km^{2} (6.6 sq mi)

Population (2024-12-31)
  - Total: 73,098
  - Density: 4,300/km^{2} (11,000/sq mi)
- Time zone: UTC+01:00 (CET)
  - Summer (DST): UTC+02:00 (CEST)
- Dialling codes: 040
- Vehicle registration: HH

Billstedt (German pronunciation: [ˈbɪlʃtɛt]) is a quarter in the borough Hamburg-Mitte, in the eastern part of Hamburg, Germany. In 2020, the population was 71,077; it was the second-most populous quarter of Hamburg.

== History ==
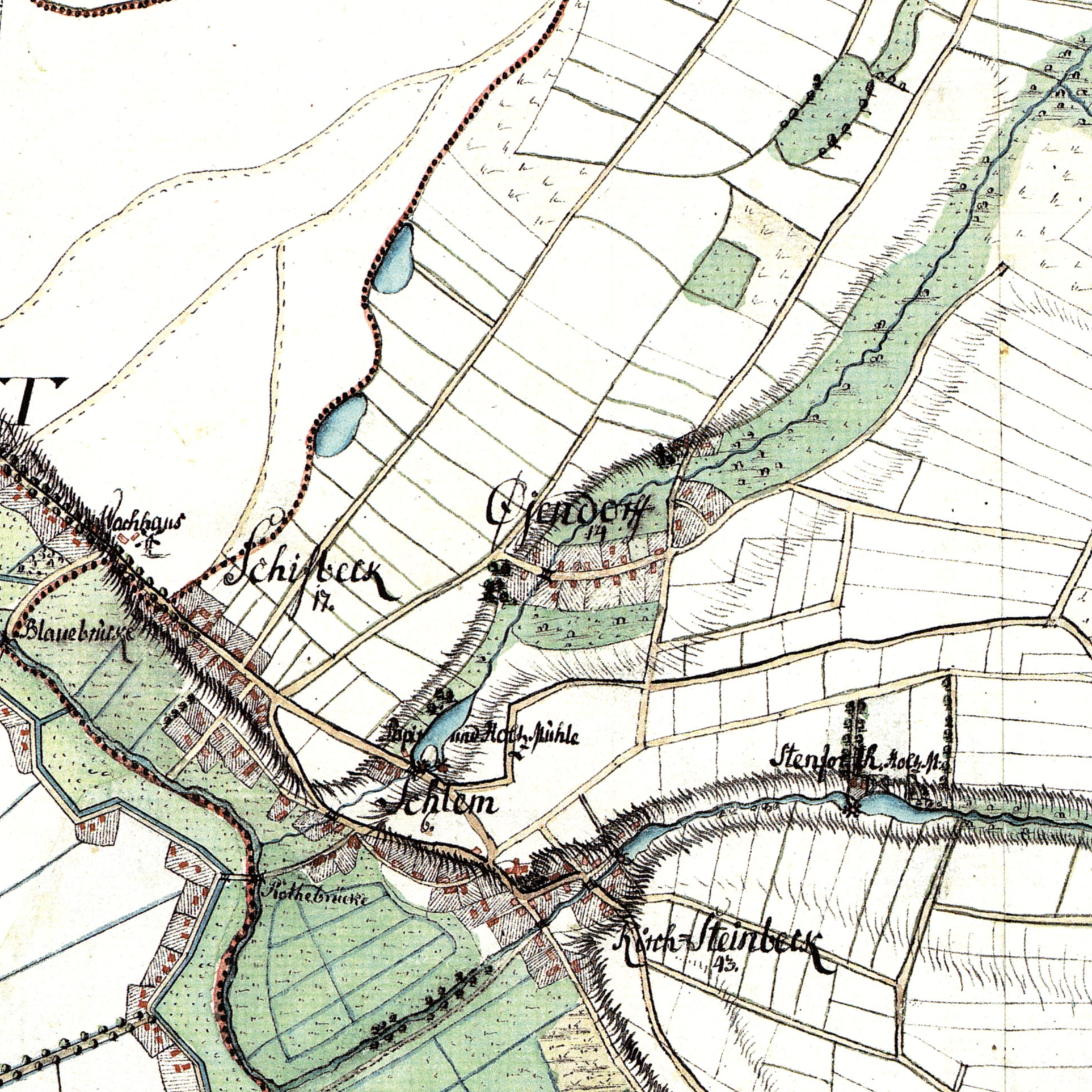
Billstedt in a military map of the 18th century.

Schifbeck, Öjendorf, Steinbeck, and Schlem are the old settlements.

== Geography ==
In 2006, according to the statistical office of Hamburg and Schleswig-Holstein, the Billstedt quarter had a total area of 17 km². To the north is the Jenfeld quarter of the Wandsbek borough. The municipalities Barsbüttel and Oststeinbek in the German state Schleswig-Holstein are to the east. To the west are the quarters Horn and Billbrook, to the south is the Lohbrügge quarter of the Bergedorf borough. In the east of Billstedt is the place Mümmelmannsberg.

== Demographics ==
In 2007, the population of the Billstedt quarter was 68,936. The population density was 4,056 inhabitants per square kilometre (10,505/sq mi). 19.7% were children under the age of 18, and 17.3% were 65 years of age or older. 22.5% were immigrants. 5,274 people were registered as unemployed. In 1999, there were 32,336 households, 39% of which were single individuals. The average household size was 2.14.

Population by year

1987	1988	1989	1990	1991	1992	1993	1994	1995	1996	1997	1998	1999
68,068	68,838	69,435	69,978	69,899	69,938	69,676	69,651	69,588	68,763	69,014	68,209	68,279

2000	2001	2002	2003	2004	2005	2006	2007
68,256	68,064	68,461	68,512	68,119	68,115	68,573	68,936

In 2007 there were 9,626 criminal offences (140/1000 people).

== Education ==
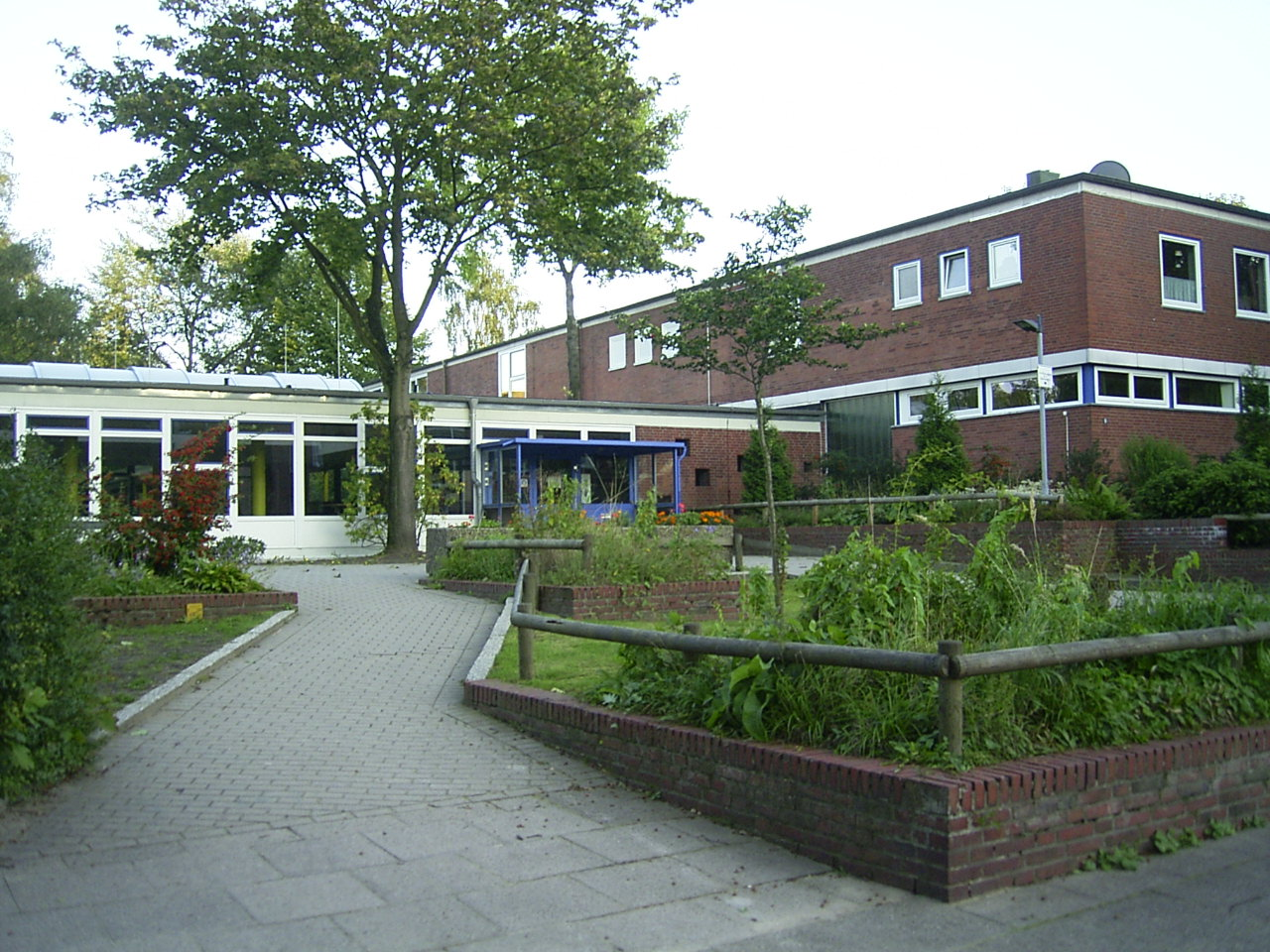
School Möllner Landstraße.

In 2006, there were 10 elementary schools and 6 secondary schools in the Billstedt quarter with 3,894 pupils.

== Politics ==
These are the results of Billstedt in the Hamburg state election:

Election	SPD	Greens	AfD	CDU	Left	FDP	Others
2020	51,5 %	12,1 %	10,7 %	9,3 %	8,0 %	3,3 %	5,1 %
2015	55,7 %	5,0 %	9,9 %	12,9 %	7,9 %	4,5 %	4,1 %
2011	56,9 %	5,4 %	–	20,1 %	7,4 %	4,1 %	6,1 %
2008	39,5 %	4,0 %	–	40,2 %	8,5 %	3,5 %	4,3 %
2004	36,4 %	4,8 %	–	44,5 %	–	3,4 %	12,0 %
2001	40,3 %	3,1 %	–	22,3 %	0,3 %	4,4 %	31,6 %
1997	43,7 %	7,0 %	–	24,6 %	0,4 %	2,1 %	22,2 %
1993	50,6 %	7,5 %	–	18,9 %	–	1,9 %	21,1 %

== Infrastructure ==
=== Health systems ===
In 2007, there were 36 day-care centers for children, 84 physicians in private practices and 12 pharmacies.

=== Transportation ===
The Bundesautobahn 1 motorway and the Bundesstrasse 5 road run through the quarter. Billstedt is served by the rapid transit system of the underground railway and has several stations on lines U2 and U4.

According to Department of Motor Vehicles (Kraftfahrt-Bundesamt) figures for 2007, 19,998 private cars (290 cars/1000 people) were registered in Billstedt, and 258 traffic accidents occurred.

=== Recreation ===
Located in the part Öjendorf is the lake Öjendorfer See.

== Notes ==
=== References ===
- Statistical office Hamburg and Schleswig-Holstein Statistisches Amt für Hamburg und Schleswig-Holstein, official website (in German)
