= Mümmelmannsberg station =

Metro station in Hamburg, Germany

Mümmelmannsberg
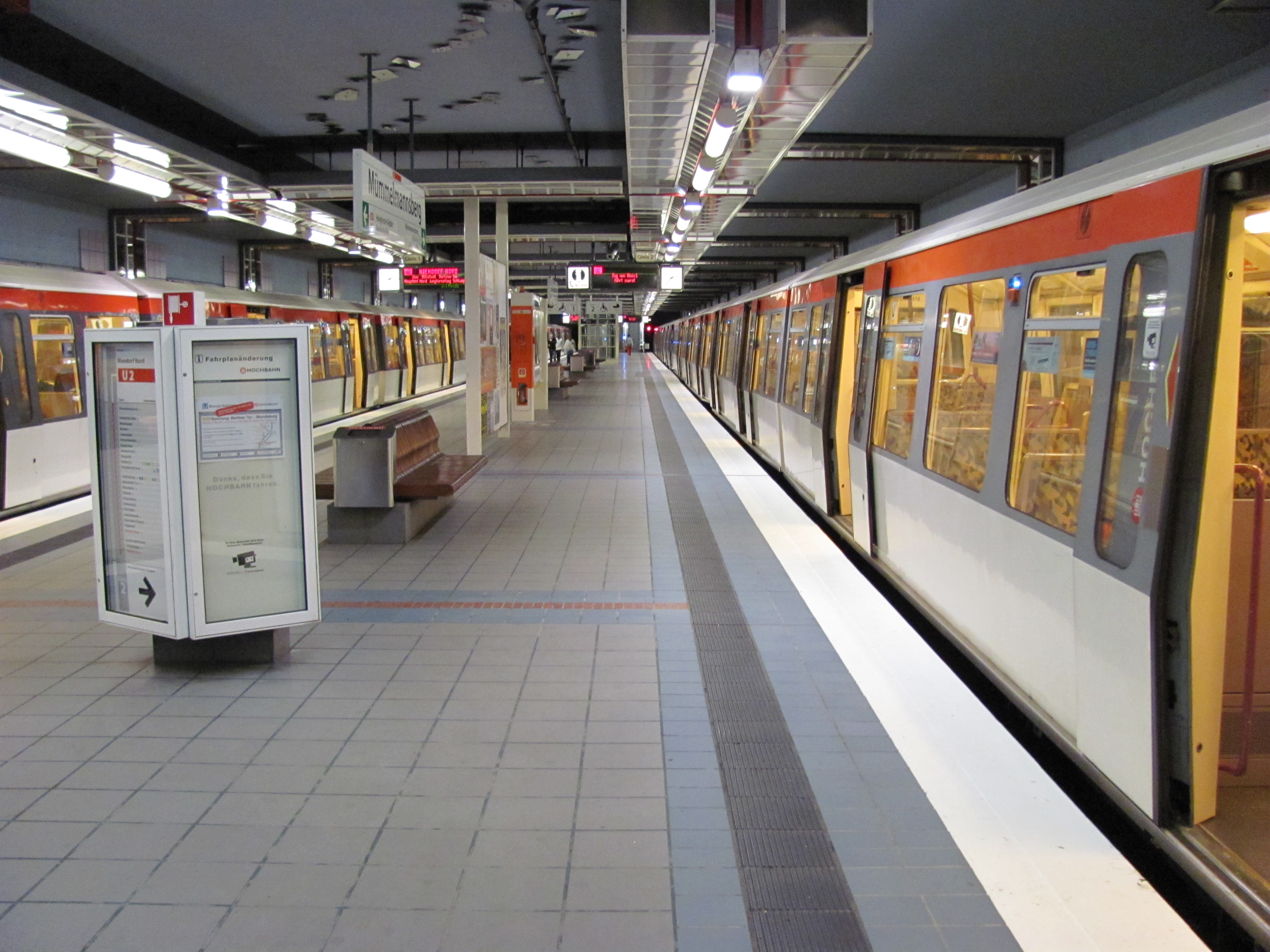

General information
- Location: Kandinskyallee; 22115 Hamburg, Germany
- Coordinates: 53°31′41″N 10°09′00″E
- System: Hamburg U-Bahn station
- Operator: Hamburger Hochbahn AG
- Line: U2
- Platforms: 1 island platform
- Tracks: 2
- Connections: Bus, Taxi

Construction
- Structure type: Underground
- Accessible: Yes

Other information
- Station code: MG
- Fare zone: HVV: B/306

History
- Opened: 29 September 1990

Services
Preceding station	Hamburg U-Bahn	Following station
Steinfurther Allee towards Niendorf Nord	U2	Terminus
Location
- Location within Hamburg Location within Germany

Mümmelmannsberg is the eastern terminus station on the Hamburg U-Bahn line U2 in Mümmelmannsberg. The underground rapid transit station was opened in 1990 and is located in the Hamburg suburb of Billstedt, Germany. Billstedt is part of the borough of Hamburg-Mitte.

== History ==
Like neighboring Steinfurther Allee station, Mümmelmannsberg station was built between 1987 and 1990. The station was designed by Hamburg architects Timm Ohrt & Hille von Seggern; the walls are partially equipped with 1980s style mirror tiles.

== Layout ==
Mümmelmannsberg station is located underneath Kandinskyallee amidst the 1960s built Mümmelmannsberg housing estate. It has entrances on either end of the platform, both with spacious mezzanine levels, opening up to the lower platform level. The station can be used as a multi-purpose building.

== Service ==
=== Trains ===
Mümmelmannsberg is served by Hamburg U-Bahn line U2; departures are every 10 minutes.

== Gallery ==
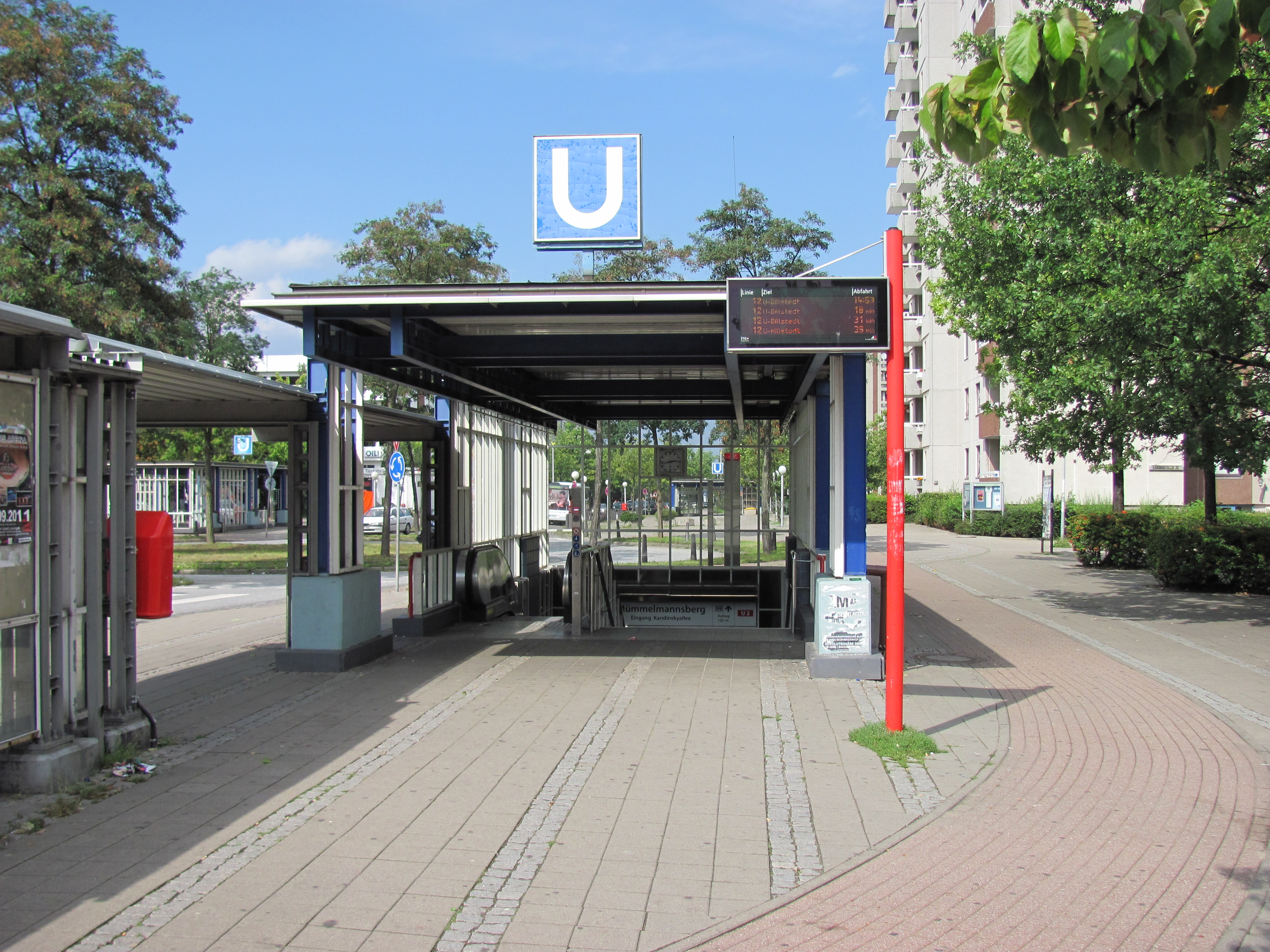
One of the two entrances

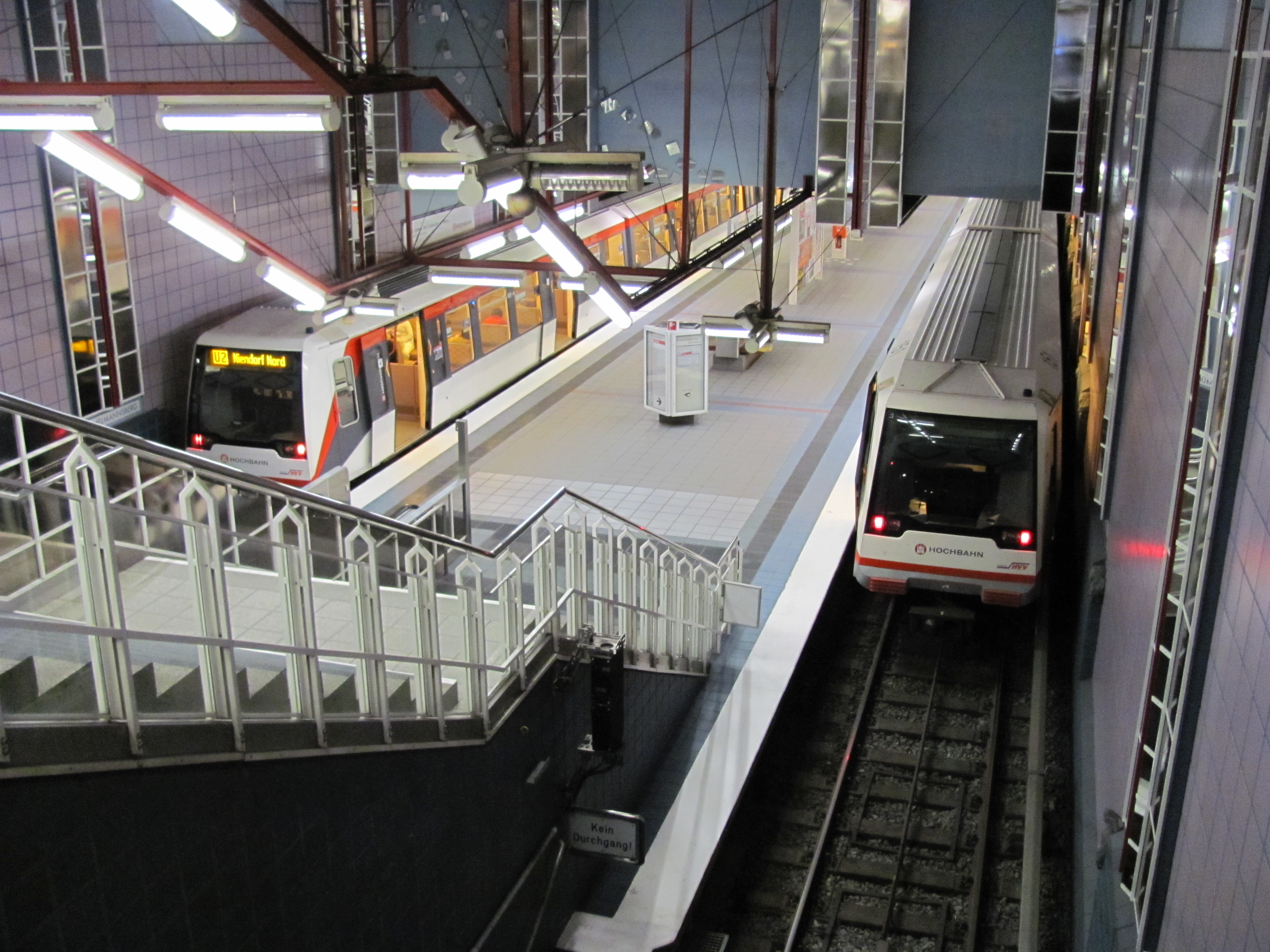
The platform seen from one of the mezzanine levels

== See also ==
- List of Hamburg U-Bahn stations
