= Niendorf Nord station =

Railway station in Hamburg, Germany

Niendorf Nord

General information
- Location: Nordalbingerweg; 22455 Hamburg, Germany
- Coordinates: 53°38′26″N 9°57′0″E
- System: Hamburg U-Bahn station
- Operator: Hamburger Hochbahn AG
- Line: U2
- Platforms: 1 island platform
- Tracks: 2
- Connections: Bus, Taxi

Construction
- Structure type: Underground
- Parking: Park and Ride (47 slots)
- Accessible: Yes

Other information
- Station code: HHA: NN
- Fare zone: HVV: A and B/203 and 303

History
- Opened: 10 March 1991; 35 years ago

Services
Preceding station	Hamburg U-Bahn	Following station
Terminus	U2	Schippelsweg towards Mümmelmannsberg
Location
- Location within Hamburg Location within Schleswig-Holstein Location within Germany Location within Europe

Niendorf Nord is the western terminus station for the rapid transit trains of Hamburg U-Bahn line U2. The station is located in the Niendorf quarter of Hamburg, Germany.

== Services ==
Niendorf Nord station platform

Niendorf Nord is served by Hamburg U-Bahn line U2; departures are every 10 minutes.

== See also ==
- List of Hamburg U-Bahn stations
- Hamburger Verkehrsverbund (Public transport association in Hamburg)
- Hamburger Hochbahn (Operator of the Hamburg U-Bahn)
