= Elections in Hamburg =

Elections in German city

The number of elections in Hamburg varies. Hamburg has a state election every five years, the elections for the state parliament. There are also elections to the federal diet (the lower house of the federal parliament) of Germany, the local elections of the diet of the boroughs (Bezirksversammlungen) and every five years to the European Parliament. All elections take place by universal adult suffrage and are regulated by law.

== Voting system ==
The voting system for the state and local elections is a mixed member proportional representation. In 2007 the Constitutional Court of Hamburg declared a new form of election threshold for the state parliament elections unconstitutional.

== Referendum and citizen's initiative ==
Since 1996 citizen's initiatives or a referendums (Volksbegehren or Volksentscheid) are possible in Hamburg.

== History ==
Through political reforms in the 1850s the Hamburg parliament turned from an assembly of delegates into an elected legislative. Franchise and terms were changed several times. Until 1901 elections - each time of one fraction of the seats - were held at three consecutive days, till 1913 at possibly up to four days along the categories of enfranchised male state citizens (with citizenship not by birth, but facultative from a certain minimum of annually accrued taxes on, and obligatory from a certain higher level on) of (1) voters enfranchised due to a certain minimum of accrued taxes (voting since 1904 in a two-round system), (2) enfranchised due to owning land within the state boundary and (3) due to counting to the burgher notables (Notabeln) consisting of former and current incumbents of state and related offices. Being included in all three groups allowed a voter to participate thrice in each election. In 1918 franchise became equal and general including woman, elections were from then on held on one day only. State elections have been held on the following dates:

| # | Date | Election |
|---|---|---|
| 1 | 14 to 21 November 1859 | 1859 Hamburg state election |
| 2 | 1861 | 1861 Hamburg state election |
| 3 | 1863 | 1863 Hamburg state election |
| 4 | 1865 | 1865 Hamburg state election |
| 5 | 1867 | 1867 Hamburg state election |
| 6 | 1869 | 1869 Hamburg state election |
| 7 | 1871 | 1871 Hamburg state election |
| 8 | 1873 | 1873 Hamburg state election |
| 9 | 1875 | 1875 Hamburg state election |
| 10 | 1877 | 1877 Hamburg state election |
| 11 | 1880 | 1880 Hamburg state election |
| 12 | 1883 | 1883 Hamburg state election |
| 13 | 1885 | 1885 Hamburg state election |
| 14 | 1887 | 1887 Hamburg state election |
| 15 | 1890 | 1890 Hamburg state election |
| 16 | 1892 | 1892 Hamburg state election |
| 17 | 1894 | 1894 Hamburg state election |
| 18 | 1896 | 1896 Hamburg state election |
| 19 | 1898 | 1898 Hamburg state election |
| 20 | early 1901 | 1901 Hamburg state election |
| 21 | begin on 13 February 1904 | 1904 Hamburg state election |
| 22 | 1907 | 1907 Hamburg state election |
| 23 | 1910 | 1910 Hamburg state election |
| 24 | 1913 | 1913 Hamburg state election |
| 25 | 16 March 1919 | 1919 Hamburg state election |
| 26 | 20 February 1921 | 1921 Hamburg state election |
| 27 | 26 October 1924 | 1924 Hamburg state election |
| 28 | 9 October 1927 | 1927 Hamburg state election |
| 29 | 19 February 1928 | 1928 Hamburg state election |
| 30 | 27 September 1931 | 1931 Hamburg state election |
| 31 | 24 April 1932 | 1932 Hamburg state election |
| 32 | 13 October 1946 | 1946 Hamburg state election |
| 33 | 16 October 1949 | 1949 Hamburg state election |
| 34 | 1 November 1953 | 1953 Hamburg state election |
| 35 | 10 November 1957 | 1957 Hamburg state election |
| 36 | 12 November 1961 | 1961 Hamburg state election |
| 37 | 27 March 1966 | 1966 Hamburg state election |
| 38 | 22 March 1970 | 1970 Hamburg state election |
| 39 | 3 March 1974 | 1974 Hamburg state election |
| 40 | 4 June 1978 | 1978 Hamburg state election |
| 41 | 6 June 1982 | June 1982 Hamburg state election |
| 42 | 19 December 1982 | December 1982 Hamburg state election |
| 43 | 9 November 1986 | 1986 Hamburg state election |
| 44 | 17 May 1987 | 1987 Hamburg state election |
| 45 | 2 June 1991 | 1991 Hamburg state election |
| 46 | 19 September 1993 | 1993 Hamburg state election |
| 47 | 21 September 1997 | 1997 Hamburg state election |
| 48 | 23 September 2001 | 2001 Hamburg state election |
| 49 | 29 February 2004 | 2004 Hamburg state election |
| 50 | 24 February 2008 | 2008 Hamburg state election |
| 51 | 20 February 2011 | 2011 Hamburg state election |
| 52 | 15 February 2015 | 2015 Hamburg state election |
| 53 | 23 February 2020 | 2020 Hamburg state election |

=== Results ===
For the election of 2009 (2004) to the European Union there were 1,256,701 (2004: 1.227.905) voters, a turnout of 34.7% (34.9), gave 432,633 (421,029) valid and 3,633 (7,834) invalid votes. For the state election 2008 there were 1,236,671 voters, with a turnout of 63.4% for the first vote (63.5% 2nd vote/party vote) gave 3,723,546 votes for the first vote (direct candidate vote) and 777,531 for the 2nd vote (party vote).

| Party | EU 2009 Votes | EU 2009 Vote % | State 2008 First Vote | State 2008 First Vote % | State 2008 Party vote (2nd vote) | State 2008 Party vote (2nd vote) % | EU 2004 Votes | EU 2004 Vote % | Difference EU 2009 to 2004 in % pts. |
|---|---|---|---|---|---|---|---|---|---|
| CDU | 128,443 | 29.7 | 1,451,742 | 39.0 | 331,067 | 42,6 | 154,690 | 36.7 | -7.1 |
| SPD | 109,766 | 25.4 | 1,214,263 | 32.6 | 265,516 | 34.1 | 106,325 | 25.3 | 0.1 |
| GRÜNE | 88,823 | 20.5 | 508,118 | 13.6 | 74,472 | 9.6 | 103,454 | 24.6 | -4.0 |
| FDP | 48,225 | 11.1 | 222,598 | 6.0 | 36,953 | 4.8 | 22,991 | 5.5 | 5.7 |
| DIE LINKE | 29,181 | 6.7 | 274,196 | 7.4 | 50,132 | 6.4 | 11,872 | 2.8 | 3.9 |
| Die Tierschutzpartei | 2,905 | 0.7 | – | – | – | – | 3,237 | 0.8 | -0.1 |
| REP | 1,527 | 0.4 | – | – | – | – | 1,589 | 0.4 | -0.0 |
| FAMILIE | 1,493 | 0.3 | – | – | – | – | 1,534 | 0.4 | -0.0 |
| DIE FRAUEN | 836 | 0.2 | – | – | – | – | 1,351 | 0.3 | -0.1 |
| Volksabstimmung | 720 | 0.2 | – | – | – | – | 1,217 | 0.3 | -0.1 |
| PBC | 806 | 0.2 | – | – | – | – | 1,027 | 0.2 | -0.1 |
| DKP | 521 | 0.1 | – | – | – | – | 900 | 0.2 | -0.1 |
| ödp | 1,054 | 0,2 | 2,065 | 0.1 | 981 | 0.1 | 677 | 0,2 | 0,1 |
| AUFBRUCH | 271 | 0.1 | – | – | – | – | 395 | 0.1 | -0,0 |
| BüSo | 123 | 0.0 | – | – | – | – | 315 | 0.1 | -0.0 |
| PSG | 153 | 0.0 | – | – | – | – | 260 | 0.1 | -0.0 |
| CM | 268 | 0.1 | – | – | – | – | 255 | 0.1 | 0.0 |
| 50Plus | 763 | 0.2 | – | – | – | – | – | – | – |
| AUF | 355 | 0,1 | – | – | – | – | – | – | – |
| BP | 188 | 0.0 | – | – | – | – | – | – | – |
| DVU | 1,538 | 0.4 | – | – | 6,354 | 0.8 | – | – | – |
| DIE GRAUEN | 794 | 0.2 | – | – | 2,399 | 0.3 | – | – | – |
| DIE VIOLETTEN | 672 | 0.2 | – | – | – | – | – | – | – |
| EDE | 235 | 0.1 | – | – | – | – | – | – | – |
| FBI | 261 | 0.1 | – | – | – | – | – | – | – |
| VOLKSENTSCHEIDE | 686 | 0.2 | – | – | – | – | – | – | – |
| FW FREIE WÄHLER | 2,564 | 0.6 | – | – | – | – | – | – | – |
| Newropeans | 443 | 0.1 | – | – | – | – | – | – | – |
| PIRATEN | 5,097 | 1.2 | 2,207 | 0.1 | 1,773 | 0.2 | – | – | – |
| RRP | 1,545 | 0.4 | – | – | – | – | – | – | – |
| RENTNER | 2,377 | 0.5 | – | – | – | – | – | – | – |
| ZENTRUM | – | – | 2,574 | 0.1 | 646 | 0.1 | – | – | – |
| Die PARTEI | – | – | 6,698 | 0.2 | 1,958 | 0.3 | – | – | – |
| Kusch | – | – | 29,746 | 0.8 | 3,519 | 0.5 | – | – | – |
| Others | – | – | 7,154 | 0.2 | – | – | 8,940 | 2.1 | – |

=== State election results maps ===
2015 Hamburg state election, Red is SPD, Green is Green, Purple for Linke

2020 Hamburg state election, Red is SPD, Green is Green, Purple for Linke
