= Kronland =

Kronland may refer to:

- the German name of Lanškroun, a town in the Czech Republic
- a "crown land", a constituent territory of Cisleithania, the Austrian half of former Austria-Hungary (1867–1918)
