= 1910 Hamburg state election =

- 1910

36 out of 160 in the Bürgerschaft
- Turnout: 93.61%
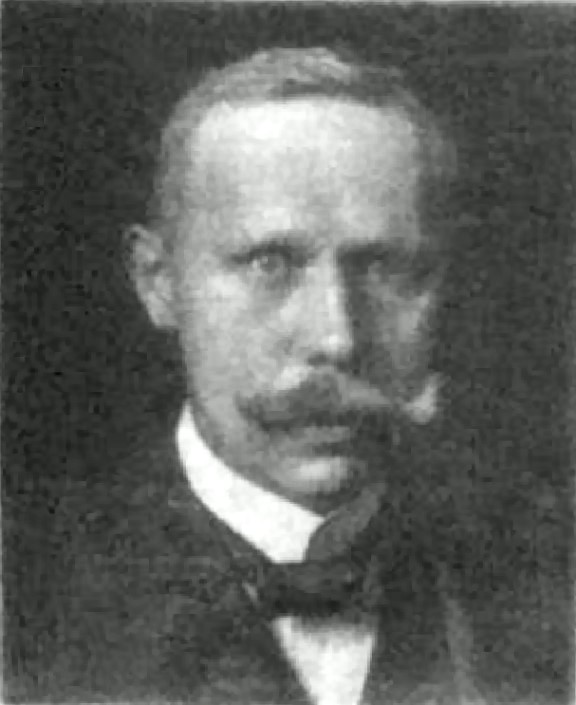

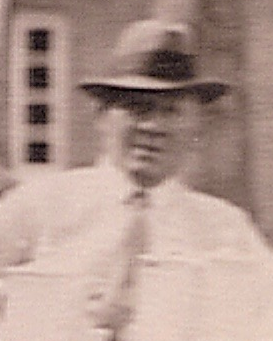

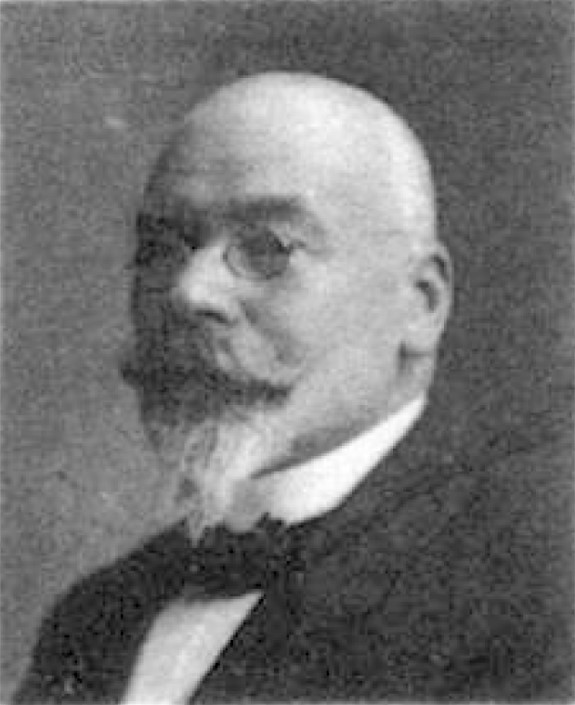
	First party	Second party	Third party
Leader	Andreas Blunck	Claus Umland	Karl Anton Gutknecht
Party	VL	SPD	L
Seats won	10	9	8
Seat change	▲6	▲1	0
	Fourth party	Fifth party
Leader	Heinrich Edmund Bohlen	Hermann Bagge
Party	R	LZ
Seats won	5	4
Seat change	▲2	▼2

The 1910 Hamburg state election was held sometime during the year 1910 in the western part of Hamburg's territory, the so-called "right-Alstershore".

== Background and electoral system ==
Enfranchised citizen, as defined for the Hamburg state elections, were males who paid a certain amount of income tax. Every voter had a total 12 votes.

After the voter disenfranchisement law of 1906, sparked by the electoral victory of the SPD, the subsequent state elections of 1907, 1910, and 1913 would use a system of heavily weighted class suffrage that divided the enfranchised male population into two groups. Group I was made up of citizen who had paid an average annual income tax of above 2,500 ℛ︁ℳ︁ for the last three years, whereas Group II was made up of citizen who paid between 1,200 and 2,500 ℛ︁ℳ︁ in taxes annually. Furthermore, landowners and the notables (primarily current and former MPs) were also enfranchised with 40 representatives per group. A weighted voting system as used to disenfranchise Group II as much as possible. It has been calculated by Margarete Wolters that a notable's vote counted 59 times, a landowner's vote 17 times, and the vote of any other Group I elector counted four times as much as a vote from any one Group II elector.

In the years 1910 and 1913, in the last elections according to the electoral law of 1906, the gradation of Hamburg's population was as follows:

Population group	Population	Allocated Seats (Note: The numbers in brackets indicate the number of seats up for actual election, the rest of representatives were the so-called elders (Erbgesessene) that were to keep a life-long seat.)
In the urban areas	77,241	72 (36)
└ Group I	28,479	48 (24)
└ Group II	48,762	24 (12)
In the rural areas	5,946	8
Land owners	8,731	40
Notables	954	40
Wealthy voters total	38,164	128
Total voters	83,187	160
Total population	1,037,275	0

== Results ==
Party	Group I			Group II			Seats			
Party	Votes	%	Seats	Votes	%	Seats	Won	Not up	Total	+/–
Social Democratic Party	8,652	5.68	1	133,939	57.05	8	9	11	20	+1
United Liberals	41,644	27.34	7	48,465	20.64	3	10	19	29	+6
Faction of the Left	40,611	26.66	7	22,858	9.74	1	8	29	37	0
Faction of the Left Centre	28,852	18.94	4	13,767	5.86	0	4	31	35	–2
Faction of the Right	32,581	21.39	5	15,751	6.71	0	5	35	40	+2
Total	152,340	100.00	24	234,780	100.00	12	36	125	161	+7
Registered voters/turnout		44.58			40.12					
Source: Von der privilegierten Herrschaft zur parlamentarischen Demokratie p. 53/54

== See also ==
- Elections in Hamburg
- 1919 Hamburg state election

== Literature ==
- Eckardt, Hans Wilhelm (2002). Von der privilegierten Herrschaft zur parlamentarischen Demokratie. Landeszentrale für politische Bildung. ISBN 3-929728-66-4
- Borowsky, Peter (2005). Schlaglichter historischer Forschung Studien zur deutschen Geschichte im 19. und 20. Jahrhundert. Hamburg University Press. ISBN 3-937816-17-8
