= Claus Umland =

German politician (1872–1957)

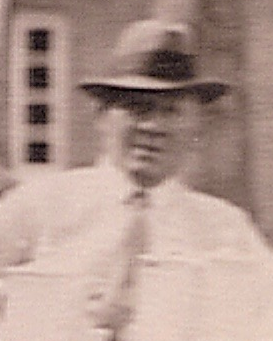
- Umland in 1928

Member of the Hamburg Parliament
- In office 1908–1933

Personal details
- Born: 1872
- Died: 1957 (aged 84–85)
- Political party: Social Democratic Party of Germany

Claus Barthold Umland (1872–1957) was a German politician of the Social Democratic Party of Germany (SPD) who served as a member of the Hamburg Parliament between 1908 and 1933. A member of the SPD since 1896, Umland served on the SPD party board in the state of Hamburg from 1919 to 1922. He was the SPD's lead candidate during the 1910 Hamburg state election, letting him defend his seat.

Umland worked as the SPD's party treasurer in Hamburg and was crucial in ensuring that the Nazis were unable to secure a majority of the SPD's party funds in the state. On 8 May 1933, Umland escaped to Lanškroun within the Sudetenland region of Czechoslovakia due to fearing an imminent arrest by the Gestapo. His suspicions were confirmed when the Gestapo did indeed show up at his Hamburg residence on 10 May to arrest him. He returned to Hamburg on 25 June 1933.

He died in 1957.
