= Rudoltice =

- Municipality
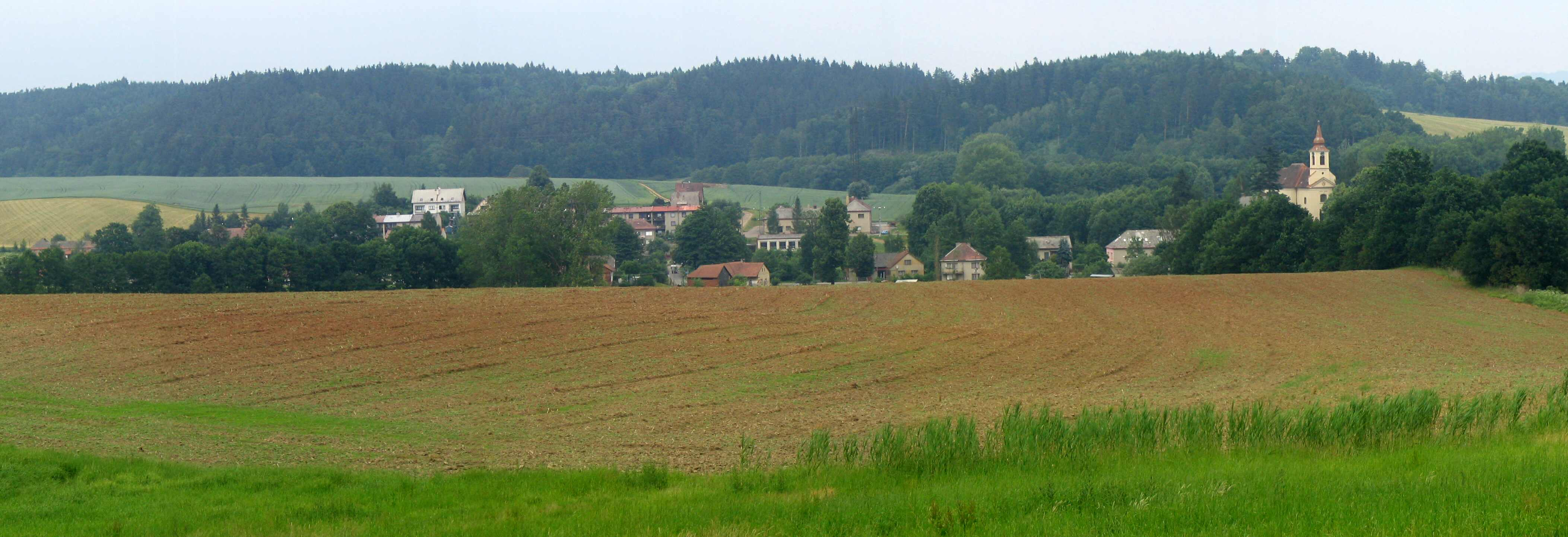
- Panorama of Rudoltice

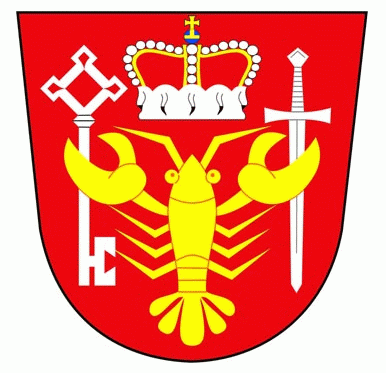
- Flag Coat of arms

- Location in the Czech Republic
- Coordinates: 49°53′54″N 16°34′12″E
- Country: Czech Republic
- Region: Pardubice
- District: Ústí nad Orlicí
- First mentioned: 1304

Area
  - Total: 15.93 km^{2} (6.15 sq mi)
- Elevation: 375 m (1,230 ft)

Population (2026-01-01)
  - Total: 1,955
  - Density: 122.7/km^{2} (317.9/sq mi)
- Time zone: UTC+1 (CET)
  - Summer (DST): UTC+2 (CEST)
- Postal code: 561 25
- Website: www.rudoltice.cz

Rudoltice (German: Rudelsdorf) is a municipality and village in Ústí nad Orlicí District in the Pardubice Region of the Czech Republic. It has about 2,000 inhabitants.

== Etymology ==
The name is derived from the personal name Rudolt, meaning "the village of Rudolt's people".

== Geography ==
Rudoltice is located about 15 kilometres (9 mi) southeast of Ústí nad Orlicí and 57 km (35 mi) east of Pardubice. It lies in the Orlické Foothills. The highest point is a hill at 593 m (1,946 ft) above sea level. The Rudoltička Stream flows through the municipality. A set of three fishponds lies in the municipality on a tributary of the Rudoltička. A small part of the Lanškroun Ponds Nature Park lies in the northern part of the municipal territory.

== History ==
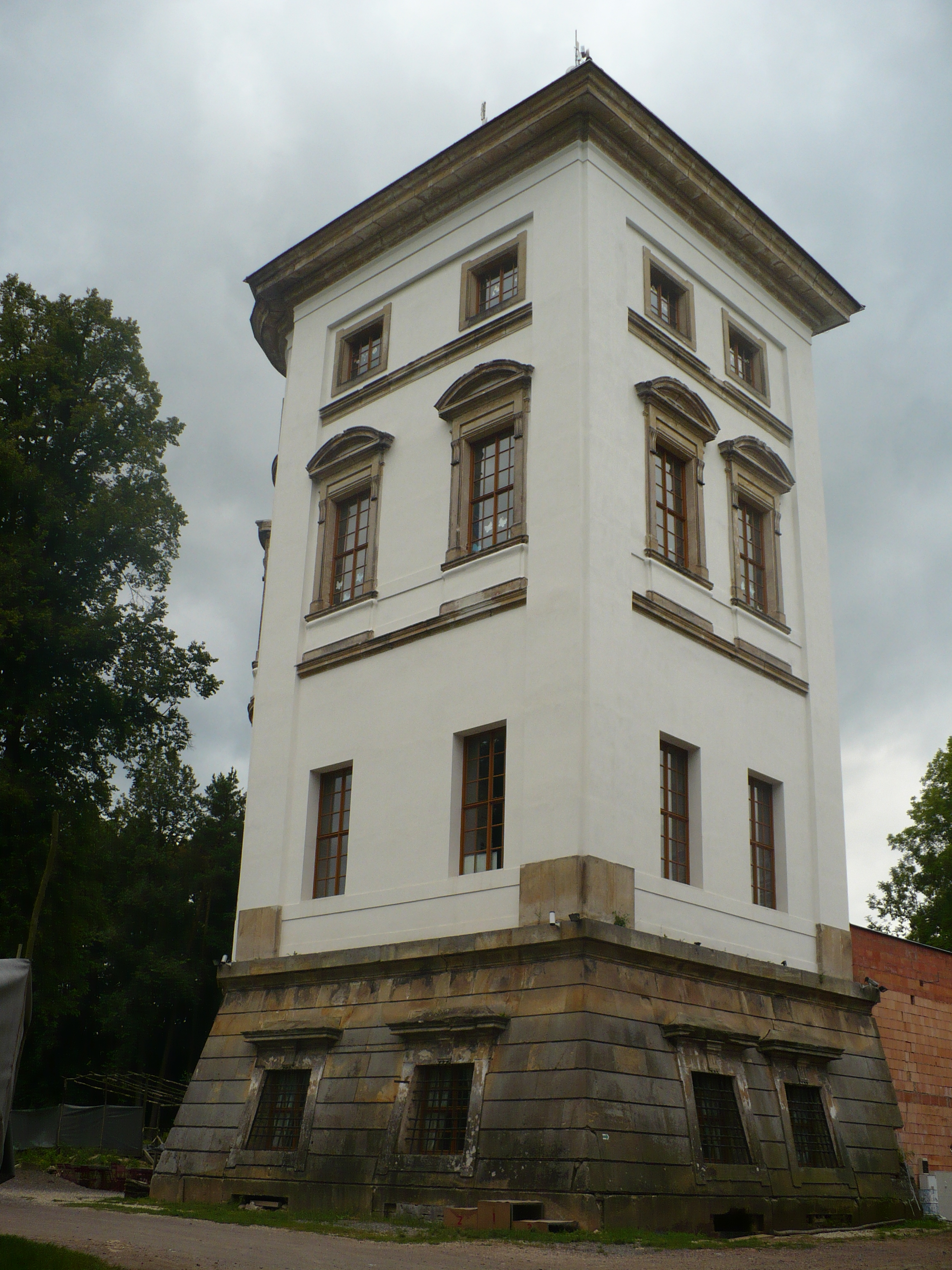
Nový zámek

Rudoltice was probably founded between 1250 and 1270, during the colonisation of Bohemia initiated by the Ottokar II. The first written mention is from 21 May 1304 under the name Rudolfsdorf, when King Wenceslaus II donated it to the Zbraslav Monastery. Rudoltice belonged to Lanšperk-Lanškroun estate during the entire Middle Ages.

The first known owners of Rudoltice were the Lords of Drnholec. Since 1349, Rudoltice was a parish village. After the Battle of White Mountain in 1622, it was acquired by the Liechtenstein family. In 1643–1646, during the Thirty Years' War, the village was plundered by various armies.

== Demographics ==
Historical population

Year	Pop.	±%
1869	1,244	—
1880	1,152	−7.4%
1890	1,065	−7.6%
1900	1,084	+1.8%
1910	1,125	+3.8%

Year	Pop.	±%
1921	1,086	−3.5%
1930	1,053	−3.0%
1950	757	−28.1%
1961	763	+0.8%
1970	744	−2.5%

Year	Pop.	±%
1980	914	+22.8%
1991	867	−5.1%
2001	922	+6.3%
2011	1,728	+87.4%
2021	1,846	+6.8%

Source: Censuses

== Transport ==
Rudoltice is located on the railway lines Česká Třebová–Zábřeh and Česká Třebová–Lanškroun.

== Sights ==
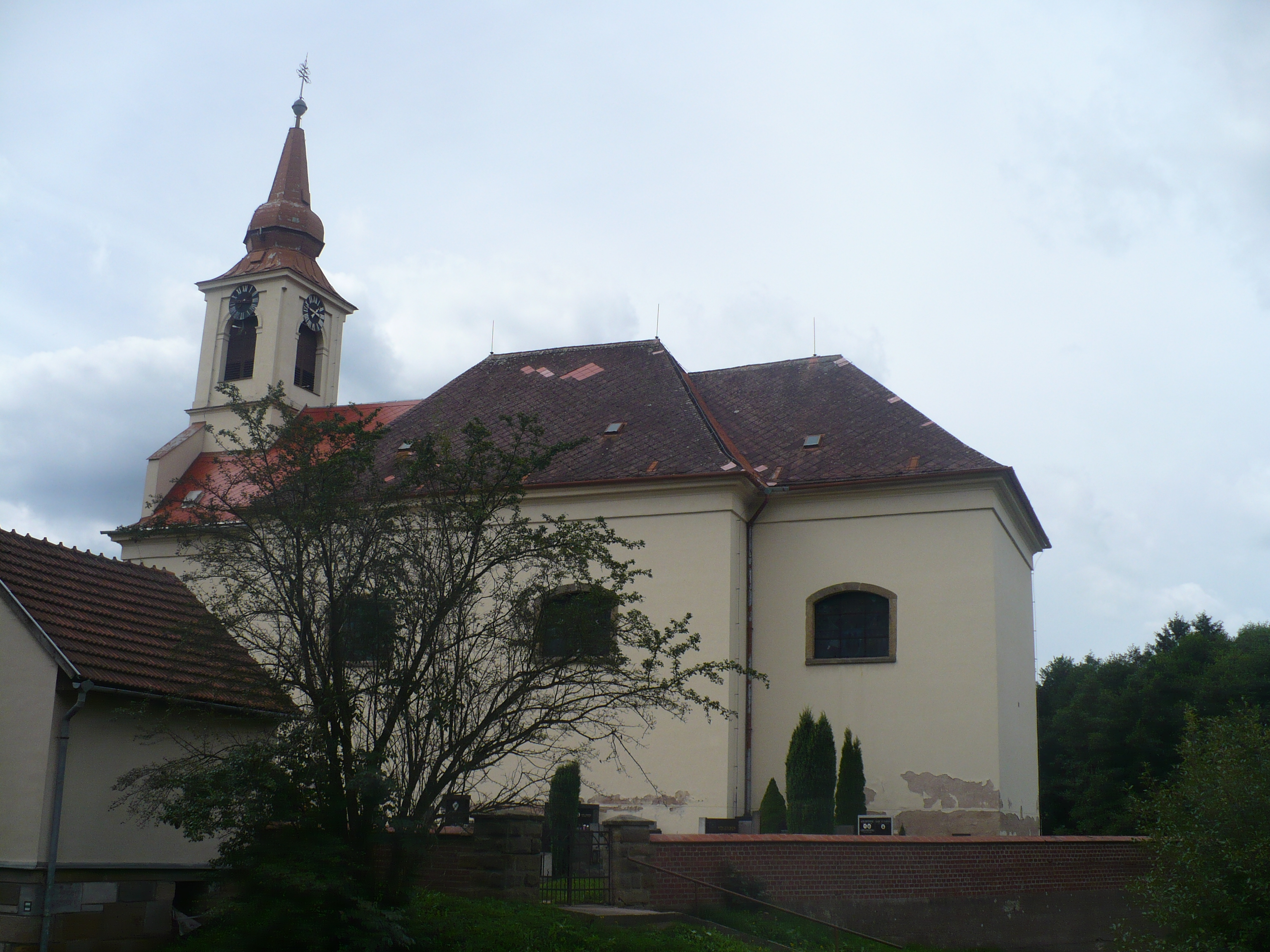
Church of Saints Peter and Paul

The main landmark of Rudoltice is the Church of Saints Peter and Paul. It was built in the late Baroque style in 1804–1809, when it replaced an old wooden church. The adjacent rectory was built in 1770–1794.

A notable building is the castle Nový zámek ('new castle'). This three-storey rectangular building is a torso of a larger castle, which was built for Hans-Adam I of Liechtenstein in 1700–1712.
