= Lanškroun Ponds Nature Park =

Nature reserve in the Czech Republic

Coordinates: 49°55′12″N 16°34′12″E

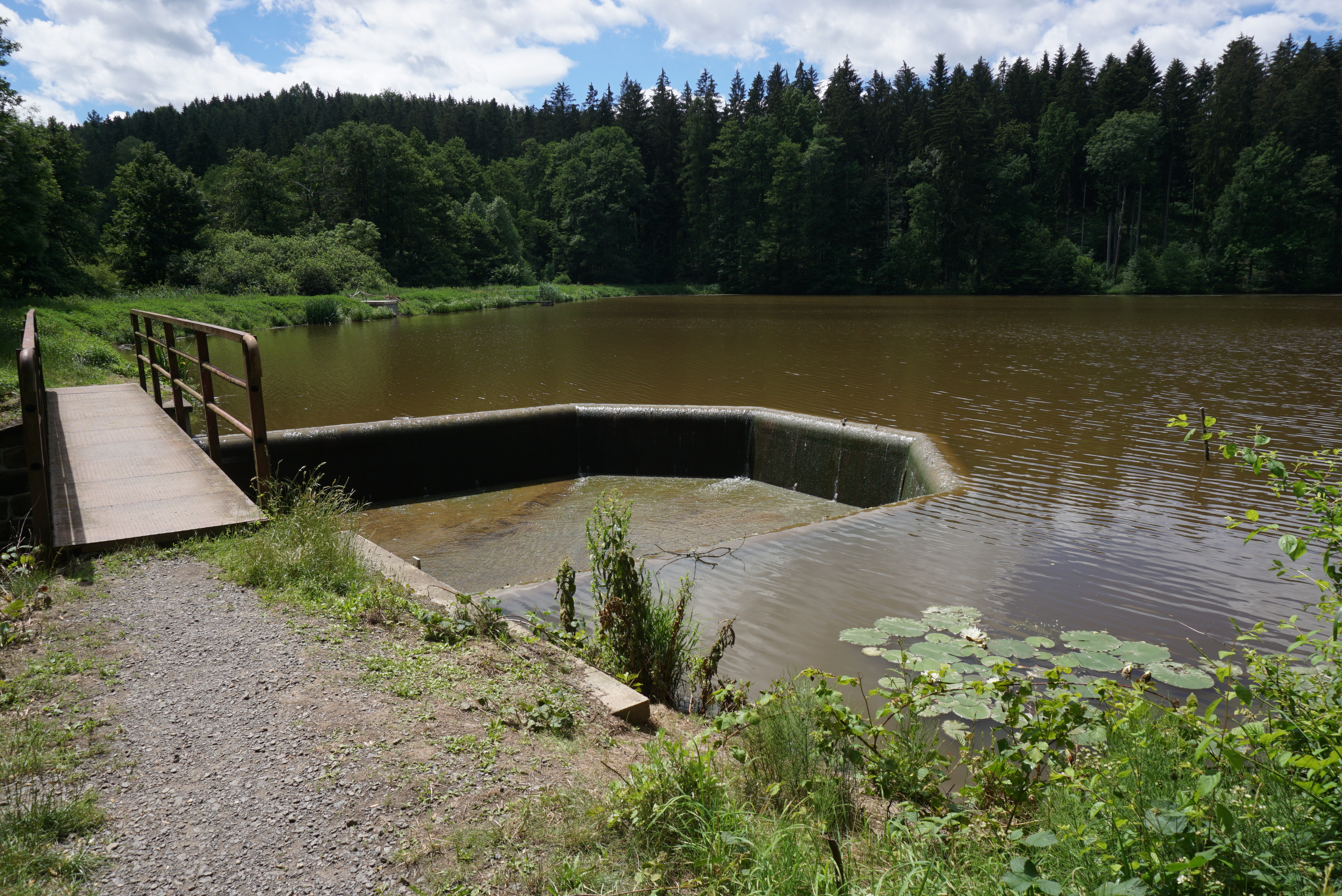
Pšeničkův Pond

Lanškroun Ponds Nature Park (Czech: Přírodní park Lanškrounské rybníky) is a nature park in Ústí nad Orlicí District in the Pardubice Region of the Czech Republic. It includes the Lanškroun Ponds Nature Reserve.

== Location ==
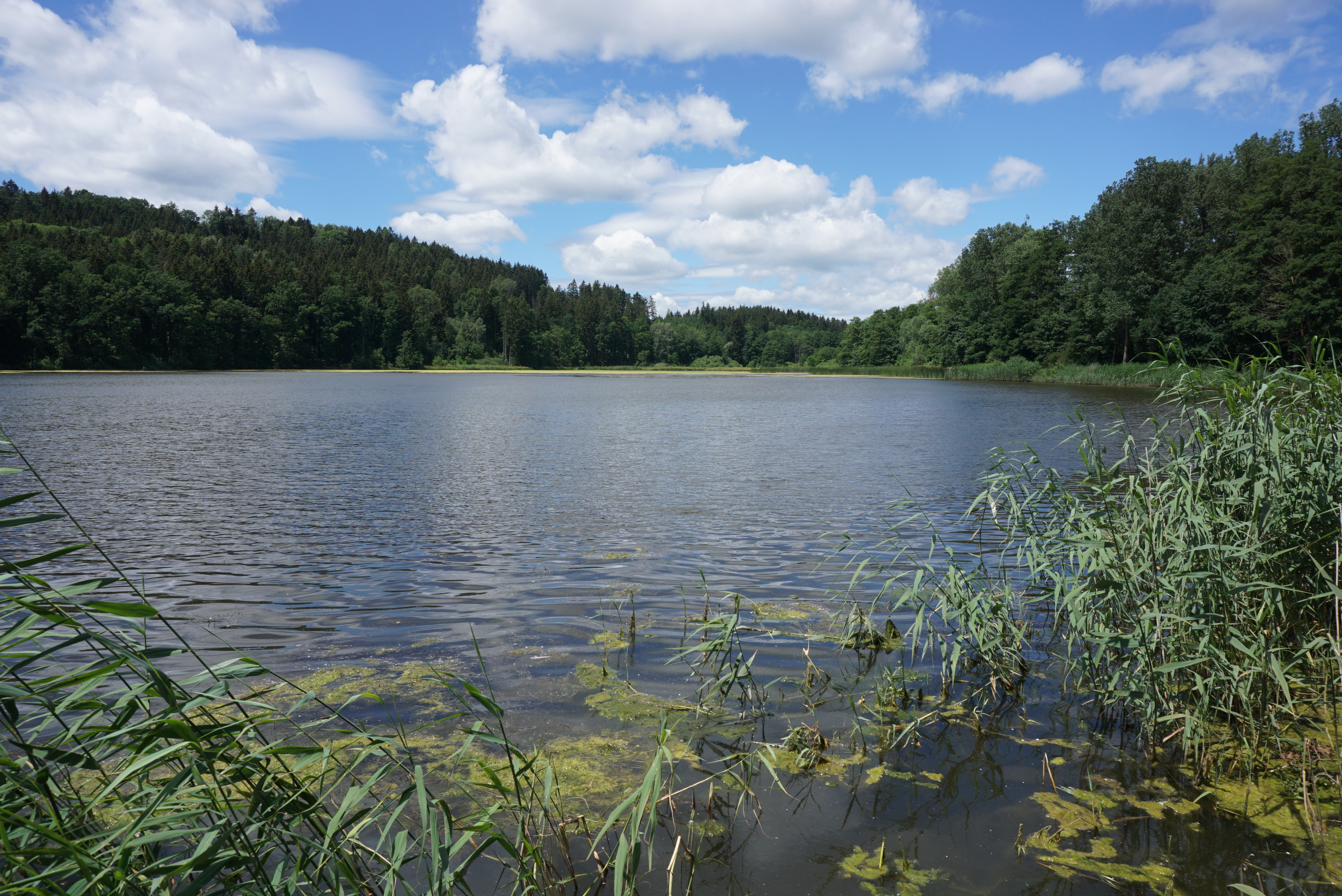
Olšový Pond

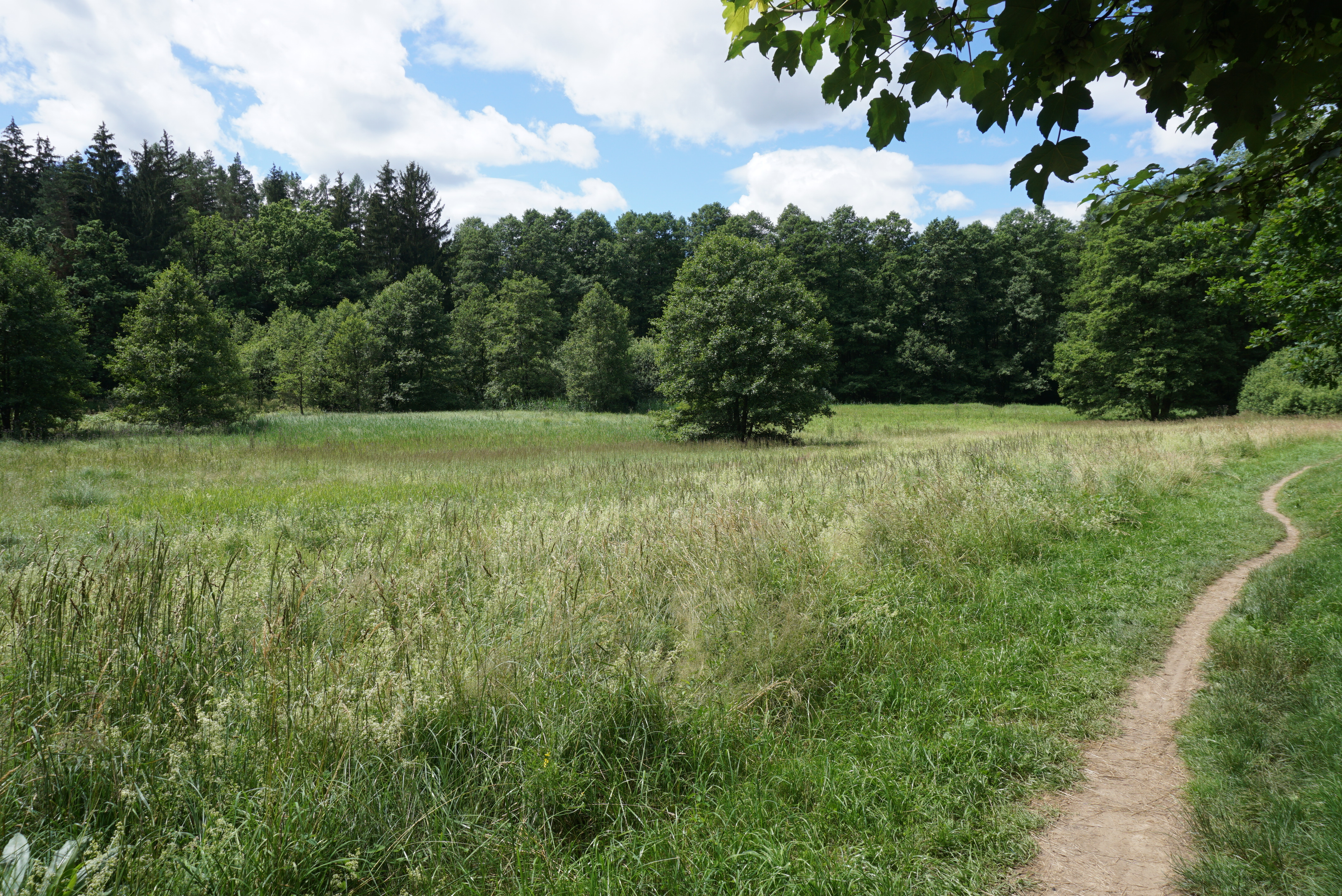
A meadow by the Pšeničkův Pond

Lanškroun Ponds Nature Park is located mostly in the municipal territory of Lanškroun, northwestern of the town. The nature park also extends into the territory of municipalities Ostrov and Rudoltice.

== Description ==
The nature park has an area of 243 hectares (600 acres), out of which 45 hectares (110 acres) are the ponds.

The nature park is formed by set of seven fish ponds on the Ostrovský Stream and their surroundings: Krátký, Dlouhý, Olšový, Pšeničkův, Plockův, Slunečný and Ostrovský. Part of the nature park is also the area around the Zadní Stream which flows in the territory into the Ostrovský Stream. The northernmost ponds, Pšeničkův and Olšový, and the closest area around the Zadní Stream are protected as a nature reserve.

== History ==
The history of pond farming started here in 1433. Dlouhý pond was founded before 1464 as the first pond in the set. The last was founded Slunečný pond in 1965. The nature park was established in 1990.

== Use ==
The nature park was established as a place for relaxation and sports activities, and also for biological and aesthetic preservation. Krátky and Slunečný are used for fishing. Dlouhý is the largest pond and is used for recreational purposes. It is a natural swimming pool with the possibility of yachting and windsurfing. An educational path leads through the nature park.

== Protection ==
The area of Lanškroun Ponds is an important nesting place for migratory birds. The common snipe, little bittern, white and black stork, water rail, osprey, great reed warbler and many duck species are among the endangered birds who nest in the area. The area is also home to European crayfish, alpine newt, European and green toad, European tree frog and other species of amphibians. The flora is typical for damp areas and includes the yellow iris, white water lilly, western marsh orchid, spring snowflake and other species.
