= Dolní Třešňovec =

- Town part
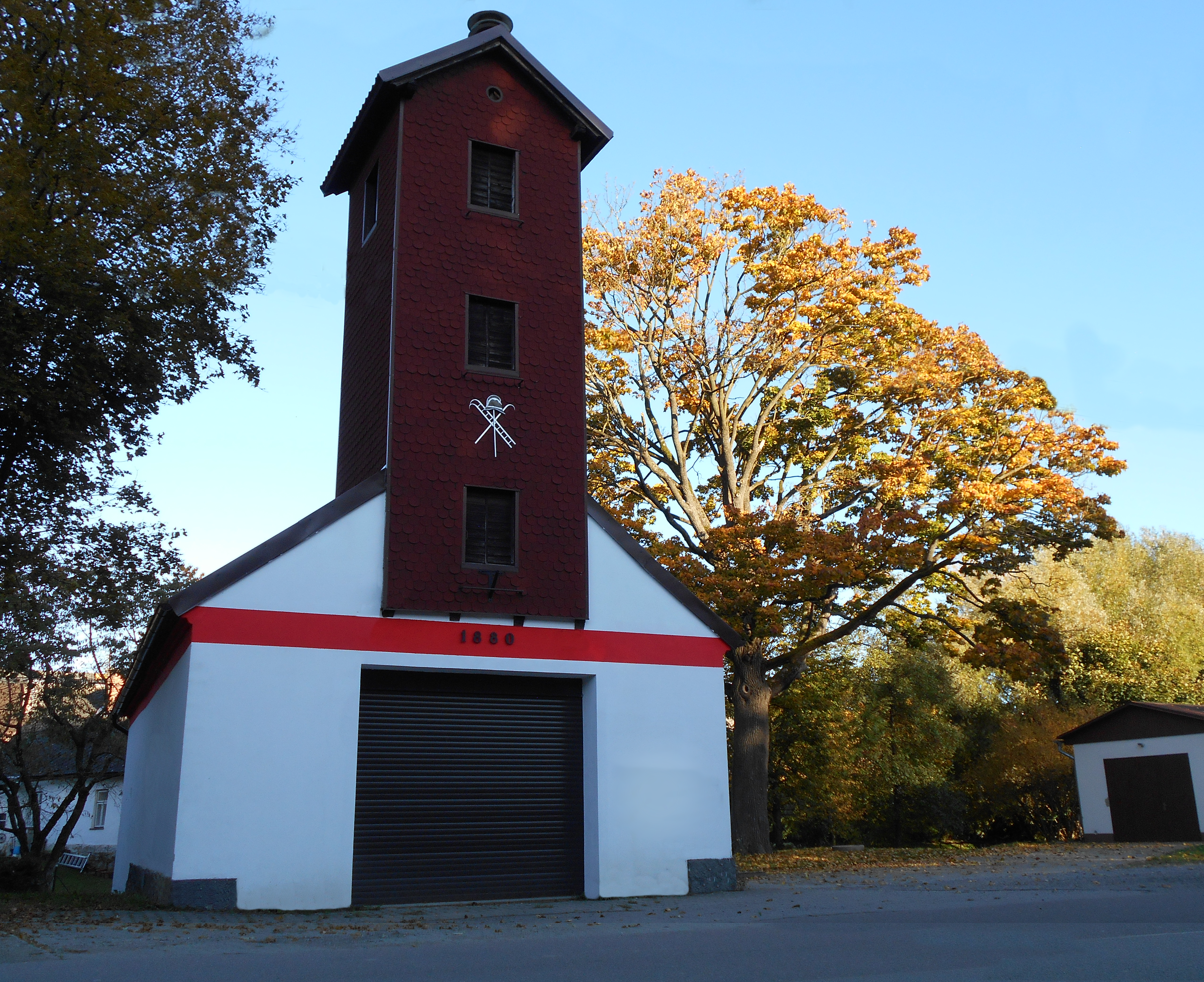
- Fire station

- Location in the Czech Republic
- Coordinates: 49°54′44″N 16°36′44″E
- Country: Czech Republic
- Region: Pardubice
- District: Ústí nad Orlicí
- Municipality: Lanškroun

Population (2021)
  - Total: 875
- Time zone: UTC+1 (CET)
  - Summer (DST): UTC+2 (CEST)
- Postal code: 563 01

Dolní Třešňovec (Czech pronunciation: [dolni: tr̝̊eʃɲovets]; German: Nieder Johnsdorf) is a municipal part of Lanškroun in Ústí nad Orlicí District in the Pardubice Region of the Czech Republic. It has about 900 inhabitants. It is located in the northern part of the town's territory. Until 1961, it was a separate municipality.

== History ==
The first written mention of Třešňovec is in a donation deed of King Wenceslaus II from 1304, in which he donated the Lanškroun region to the Zbraslav Monastery. In 1509, for the first time, Dolní and Horní Třešňovec are distinguished. In 1793, the first school in Dolní Třešňovec was built. In 1798, Dolní Třešňovec became an independent political community. Until then, all purchases and transfers of ownership had to be confirmed by the Lanškroun City Council. During Austro-Prussian War in 1866, a large number of Prussian soldiers were housed in Dolní Třešňovec. In 1880, the local volunteer fire department was founded. In 1894, a two-classroom school building with a teacher's apartment and a gym was built opposite the old school. In the same year, on the occasion of the imperial maneuvers, Franz Joseph I of Austria personally went to Dolní Třešňovec and awarded some veterans with a golden cross of honour.

A difficult situation arose in 1905, when the manor of Dolní Třešňovec was offered for sale. The Czechs offered any price just to gain ownership of a huge complex just near to Lanškroun. So the money had to be found on the private market. Since no suitable German buyer could be found for the entire property, the fields and meadows were sold piece by piece, and the building with parts of the land was taken over in 1907 by the League of Germans against Czechs for the orphanage. Due to the fact that the orphanage was permanently occupied by 40–60 pupils until its abolition in 1941, most of them then became pupils of the Dolní Třešňovec's School, the expansion of the school was carried out in 1909 under the leadership of the municipal leader Johann Peichl. In the summer of 1923, the municipality had a memorial built for the 34 victims of World War I. Electricity was introduced here in 1928.

In 1961, Dolní Třešňovec again became a part of Lanškroun.

== Demographics ==
Historical population

| Year | Pop. | ±% |
|---|---|---|
| 1869 | 578 | — |
| 1880 | 609 | +5.4% |
| 1890 | 668 | +9.7% |
| 1900 | 717 | +7.3% |
| 1910 | 796 | +11.0% |

| Year | Pop. | ±% |
|---|---|---|
| 1921 | 723 | −9.2% |
| 1930 | 667 | −7.7% |
| 1950 | 483 | −27.6% |
| 1961 | 509 | +5.4% |
| 1970 | 1,314 | +158.2% |

| Year | Pop. | ±% |
|---|---|---|
| 1980 | 543 | −58.7% |
| 1991 | 909 | +67.4% |
| 2001 | 901 | −0.9% |
| 2011 | 804 | −10.8% |
| 2021 | 875 | +8.8% |

Source: Censuses

== Sport ==
The football club TJ Sokol Dolní Třešňovec was founded in 1956. The team participates in the 8th highest Czech competition.

== Education ==
In 1946, the Agricultural and Veterinary Secondary School was founded in the building of the former orphanage. On 1 September 1964, the new building of the Agricultural and Veterinary Secondary School was opened. In 2008 and 2009, the main school buildings were renovated. At the same time, a new cowshed and veterinary centre were built. Two fields of study are currently taught at the school: Agribusiness and Veterinary Medicine.

== Sights ==
There are no protected cultural monuments in Dolní Třešňovec.
