= Ostrov (Ústí nad Orlicí District) =

- Municipality
- Saint Nicholas church and magistrate building

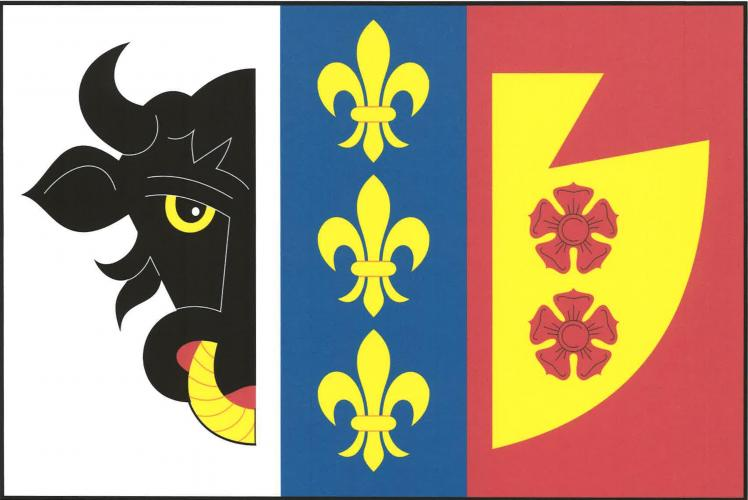
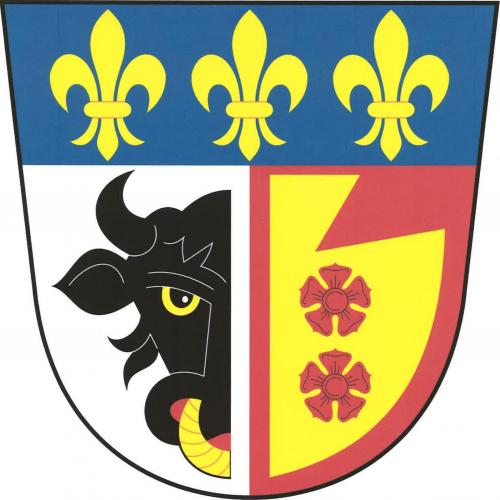
- Flag Coat of arms

- Location in the Czech Republic
- Coordinates: 49°55′49″N 16°32′26″E
- Country: Czech Republic
- Region: Pardubice
- District: Ústí nad Orlicí
- First mentioned: 1292

Area
  - Total: 18.49 km^{2} (7.14 sq mi)
- Elevation: 396 m (1,299 ft)

Population (2026-01-01)
  - Total: 730
  - Density: 39/km^{2} (100/sq mi)
- Time zone: UTC+1 (CET)
  - Summer (DST): UTC+2 (CEST)
- Postal code: 561 22
- Website: www.obecostrov.cz

Ostrov is a municipality and village in Ústí nad Orlicí District in the Pardubice Region of the Czech Republic. It has about 700 inhabitants. A small part of the Lanškroun Ponds Nature Park lies in the municipality.

Ostrov lies approximately 11 kilometres (7 mi) south-east of Ústí nad Orlicí, 56 kilometres (35 mi) east of Pardubice, and 153 kilometres (95 mi) east of Prague.

== Demographics ==
Historical population
Year	Pop.	±%
1869	1,589	—
1880	1,453	−8.6%
1890	1,419	−2.3%
1900	1,321	−6.9%
1910	1,335	+1.1%
1921	1,137	−14.8%
1930	1,087	−4.4%
1950	625	−42.5%
1961	585	−6.4%
1970	561	−4.1%
1980	598	+6.6%
1991	584	−2.3%
2001	578	−1.0%
2011	621	+7.4%
2021	632	+1.8%
Source: Censuses
