= 1913 Hamburg state election =

Election in Germany

- 1913

36 out of 160 in the Bürgerschaft
- Turnout: 94.60% ▲0.99pp
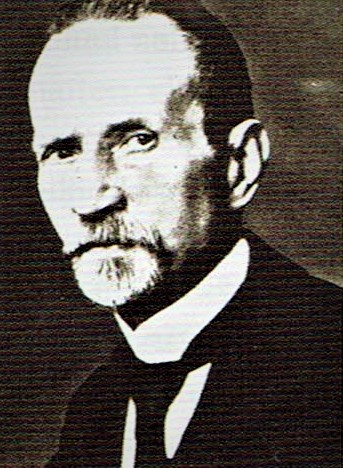

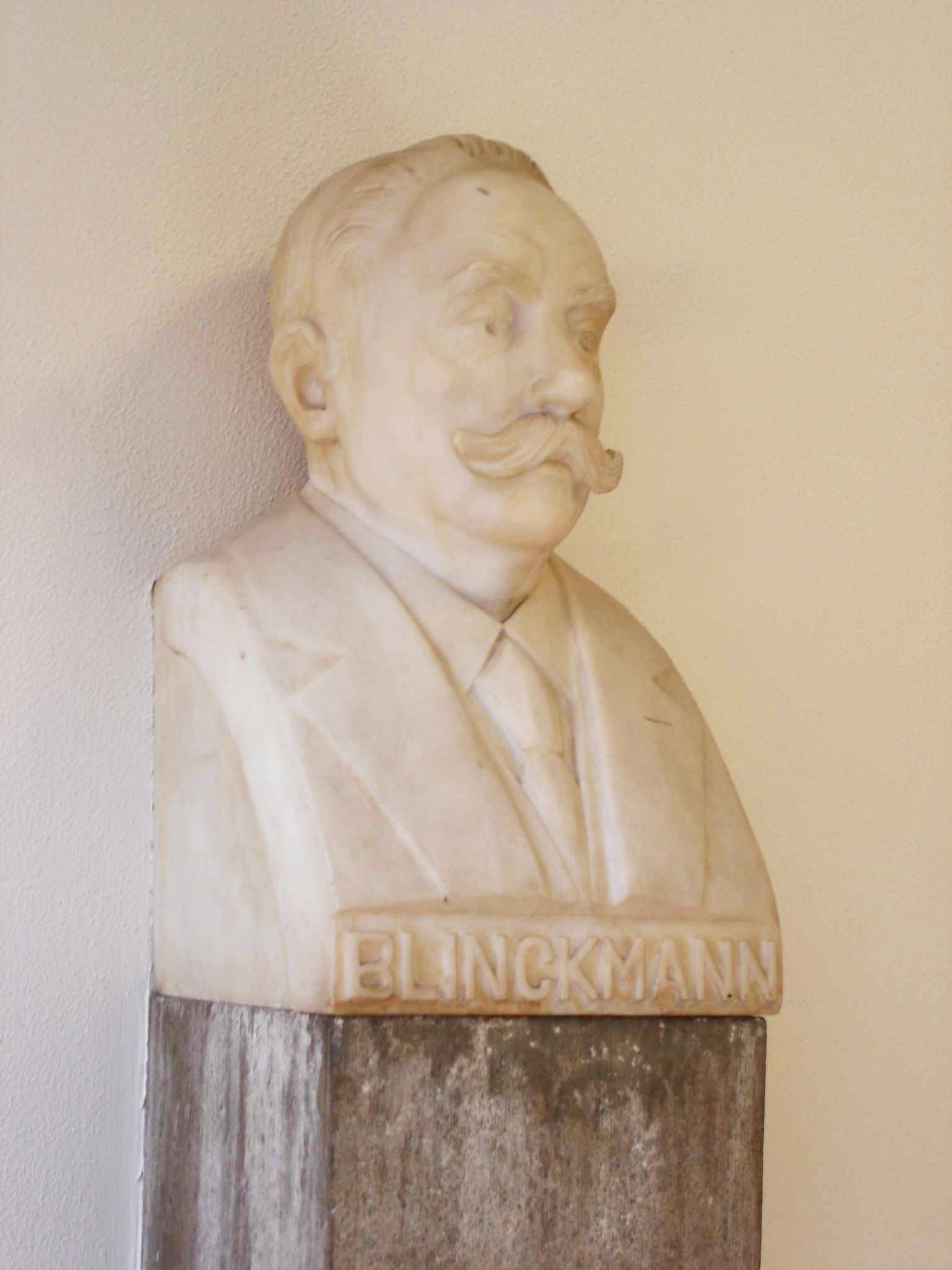
| | First party | Second party | Third party |
|---|---|---|---|
| | | Basedow |
| Leader | Otto Stolten | Hermann Basedow | Dietrich Heinrich Daniel Blinckmann |
| Party | SPD | VL | L |
| Seats won | 10 | 8 | 7 |
| Seat change | ▲1 | ▼2 | ▼1 |
| | Fourth party | Fifth party |
| Leader | Dr. H. von Reiche | Binder |
| Party | R | LZ |
| Seats won | 6 | 5 |
| Seat change | ▲1 | ▲1 |

The 1913 Hamburg state election was held sometime in 1913. The electorate was split into two regions, the inner city with one electoral district, and the rural regions with four electoral districts.

== Background and electoral system ==
Enfranchised citizen, as defined for the Hamburg state elections, were males who paid a certain amount of income tax. Every voter had a total 12 votes.

After the voter disenfranchisement law of 1906, sparked by the electoral victory of the SPD, the subsequent state elections of 1907, 1910, and 1913 would use a system of heavily weighted class suffrage that divided the enfranchised male population into two groups. Group I was made up of citizen who had paid an average annual income tax of above 2,500 ℛ︁ℳ︁ for the last three years, whereas Group II was made up of citizen who paid between 1,200 and 2,500 ℛ︁ℳ︁ in taxes annually. Furthermore, landowners and the notables (primarily current and former MPs) were also enfranchised with 40 representatives per group. A weighted voting system as used to disenfranchise Group II as much as possible. It has been calculated by Margarete Wolters that a notable's vote counted 59 times, a landowner's vote 17 times, and the vote of any other Group I elector counted four times as much as a vote from any one Group II elector.

In the years 1910 and 1913, in the last elections according to the electoral law of 1906, the gradation of Hamburg's population was as follows:

| Population group | Population | Allocated Seats (Note: The numbers in brackets indicate the number of seats up for actual election, the rest of representatives were the so-called elders (Erbgesessene) that were to keep a life-long seat.) |
|---|---|---|
| In the urban areas | 77,241 | 72 (36) |
| └ Group I | 28,479 | 48 (24) |
| └ Group II | 48,762 | 24 (12) |
| In the rural areas | 5,946 | 8 |
| Land owners | 8,731 | 40 |
| Notables | 954 | 40 |
| Wealthy voters total | 38,164 | 128 |
| Total voters | 83,187 | 160 |
| Total population | 1,037,275 | 0 |

== Results ==
| Party | Group I | | | Group II | | | Seats | | | |
| Party | Votes | % | Seats | Votes | % | Seats | Won | Not up | Total | +/– |
|---|---|---|---|---|---|---|---|---|---|---|
| Social Democratic Party | 13,845 | 8.75 | 2 | 197,196 | 62.16 | 8 | 10 | 10 | 20 | +1 |
| United Liberals | 39,499 | 24.97 | 6 | 58,133 | 18.33 | 2 | 8 | 17 | 28 | -2 |
| Faction of the Left | 38,765 | 24.50 | 6 | 24,667 | 7.78 | 1 | 7 | 28 | 36 | -1 |
| Faction of the Left Centre | 29,047 | 18.36 | 5 | 12,278 | 3.87 | 0 | 5 | 31 | 36 | +1 |
| Faction of the Right | 29,838 | 18.86 | 5 | 18,629 | 5.87 | 1 | 6 | 36 | 40 | +1 |
| Hamburger Conservative Alliance | 6,144 | 3.88 | 0 | 4,959 | 1.56 | 0 | 0 | 0 | 0 | ±0 |
| Fruit- and Vegetable-traders | 451 | 0.29 | 0 | 1,318 | 0.42 | 0 | 0 | 0 | 0 | ±0 |
| Independents | 619 | 0.39 | 0 | 52 | 0.02 | 0 | 0 | 0 | 0 | ±0 |
| Total | 158,208 | 100.00 | 24 | 317,232 | 100.00 | 12 | 36 | 122 | 160 | ±0 |
| Registered voters/turnout | | 94.60 (Note: For both groups combined.) | | | | | | | | |
Source: Die Ergebnisse der Wahlen zur hamburgischen Bürgerschaft im Jahre 1913. p. 6

== Literature ==
- Prof. Dr. Sköllin (1919). Statistische Mittteilung über den hamburgischen Staat, Nr. 8 – Die Neuwahl der hamburgischen Bürgerschaft am 16. März 1919. Direktor des Statistischen Landesamtes
- Eckardt, Hans Wilhelm (2002). Von der privilegierten Herrschaft zur parlamentarischen Demokratie. Landeszentrale für politische Bildung. ISBN 3-929728-66-4
- Niehuss, Merith (1989). Strategien zur Machterhaltung bürgerlicher Eliten am Beispiel kommunaler Wahlrechtsänderungen im ausgehenden Kaiserreich, Scripta Mercaturae Verlag.
