= 1921 Hamburg state election =

- February 20, 1921

All 160 in the Bürgerschaft
- Turnout: 70.9% ▼9.65pp
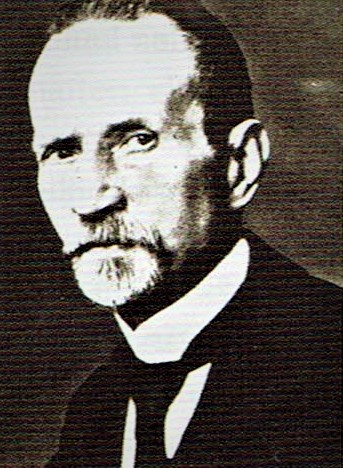

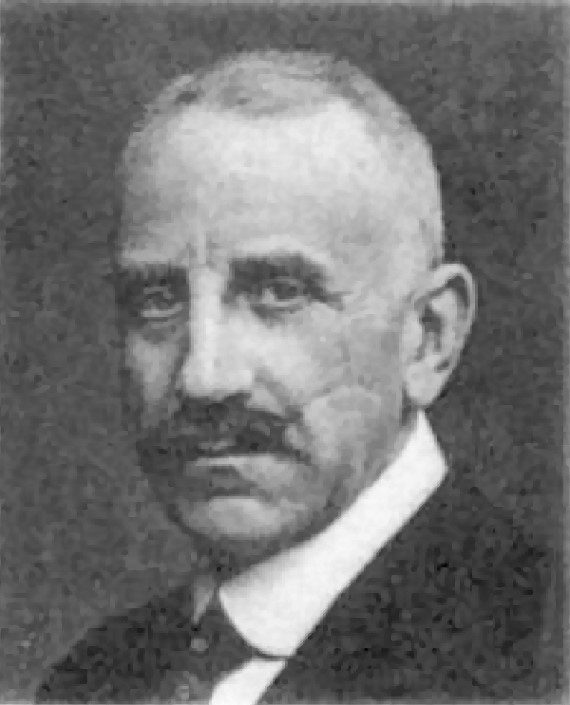

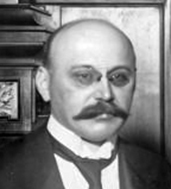

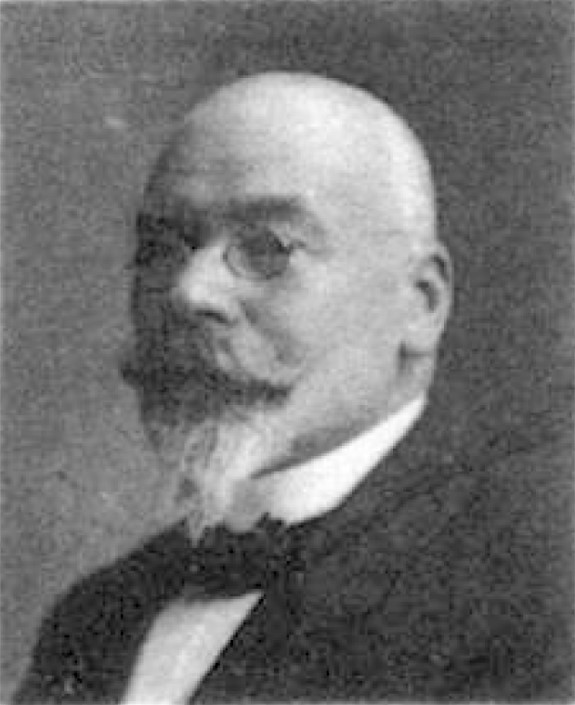

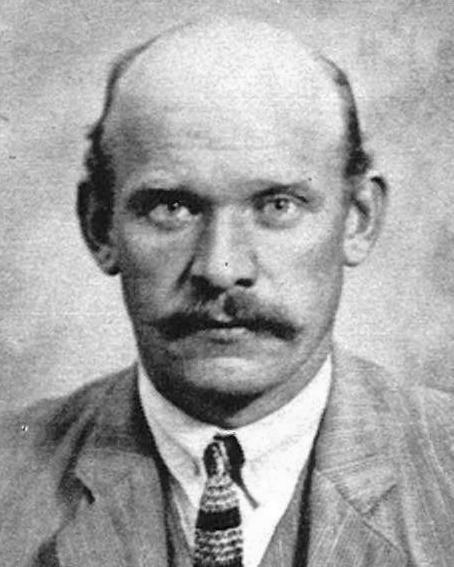

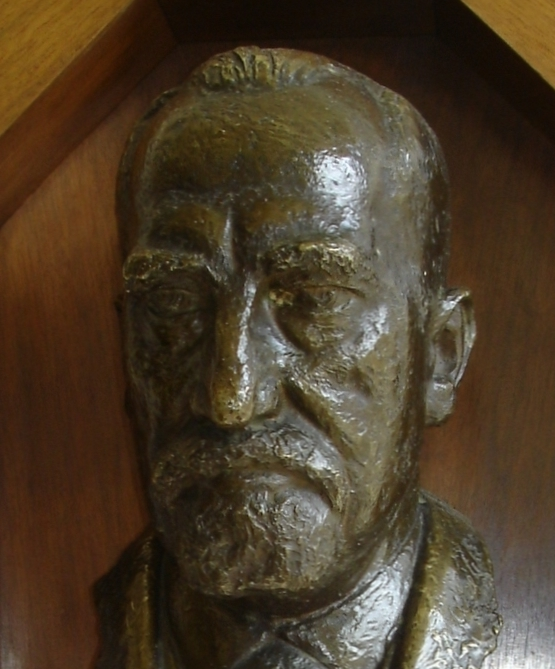

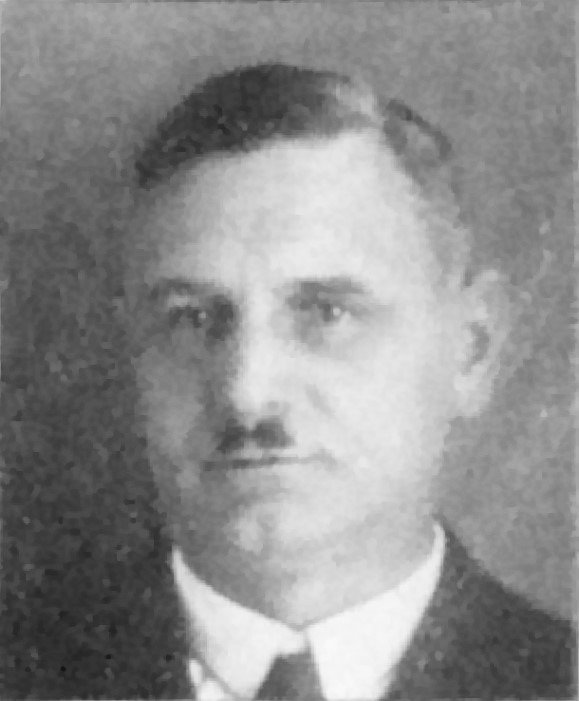

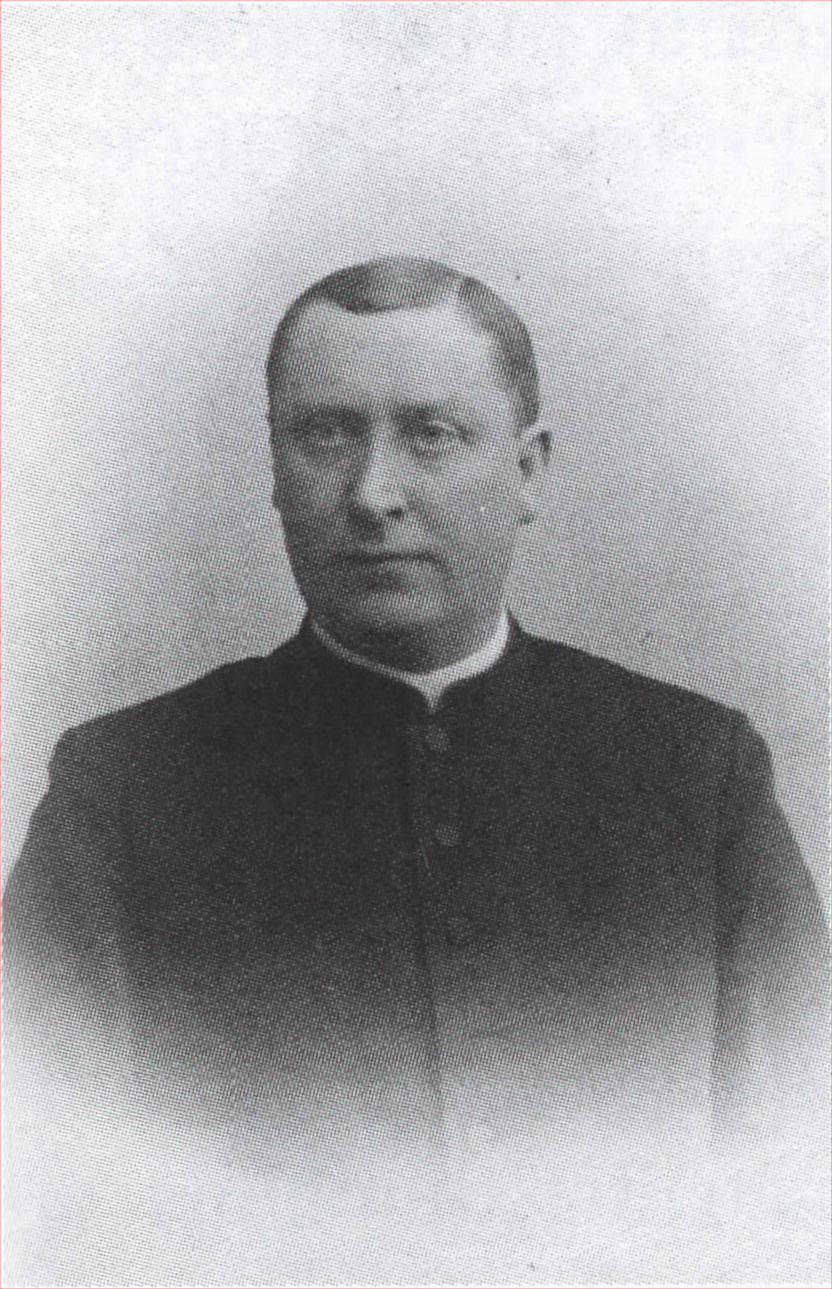
	First party	Second party	Third party
Leader	Otto Stolten	Carl Wilhelm Petersen	Franz Heinrich Witthoefft
Party	SPD	DDP	DVP
Last election	82 seats, 50.5%	33 seats, 20.5%	13 seats, 8.6%
Seats won	67	23	23
Seat change	▼15	▼10	▲10
Popular vote	217,774	75,576	74,517
Percentage	40.6%	14.1%	13.9%
Swing	▼9.9%	▼6.4%	▲5.3%
	Fourth party	Fifth party	Sixth party
Leader	Karl Anton Gutknecht	Ernst Thälmann	Johannes Hirsch
Party	DNVP	KPD	Hamburgischer Wirtschaftsbund
Last election	4 seats, 2.9%	Did not run	7 seat, 4.2%
Seats won	18	18	5
Seat change	▲14	▲18	▼2
Popular vote	60,446	59,179	18,826
Percentage	11.3%	11.0%	3.5%
Swing	▲8.4%	▲11.0%	▼0.7
	Seventh party	Eighth party	Ninth party
	Eddelbüttel
Leader	Dr. J.F.T. Eddelbüttel	Paul Bergmann	Bernhard Dinkgrefe
Party	Dr. Eddelbüttel	USPD	Centre
Last election	Did not exist	13 seats, 2.5%	Did not run
Seats won	3	2	1
Seat change	▲3	▼11	▲1
Popular vote	12,049	7,686	6,575
Percentage	3.5%	1.4%	1.2%
Swing	▲3.5%	▼1.1%	▲1.2%

The 1921 Hamburg state election was held on 20 February 1921 to elect the 160 members of the Hamburg Parliament.

== Results ==
Party	Votes	%	Seats	+/–
Social Democratic Party of Germany	217,774	40.6	67	–15
German Democratic Party	75,576	14.1	23	–10
German People's Party	74,517	13.9	23	+10
German National People's Party	60,446	11.3	18	+14
Communist Party of Germany	59,179	11.0	18	New
Hamburgischer Wirtschaftsbund	18,826	3.5	5	–2
Dr. Eddelbüttel	12,049	2.3	3	New
Independent Social Democratic Party of Germany	7,686	1.4	2	–11
Centre Party	6,575	1.2	1	New
Funke	1,328	0.3	1	New
Albert Martens Hamburg	1,106	0.2	0	New
Exekutivbeamte der Polizeibehörde Hamburg	1,071	0.2	0	New
Invalid/blank votes	2,166	–	–	–
Total	538,299	100	160	0
Registered voters/turnout	759,283	70.9	–	
Source: Elections in the Weimar Republic

== Literature ==
- Prof. Dr. Sköllin (1921). Statistische Mittteilung über den hamburgischen Staat, Nr. 11 - Die Bürgerschaftswahl am 20. Februar 1921. Direktor des Statistischen Landesamtes
