= 1919 Hamburg state election =

- March 16, 1919

All 160 in the Bürgerschaft
- Turnout: 80.55%
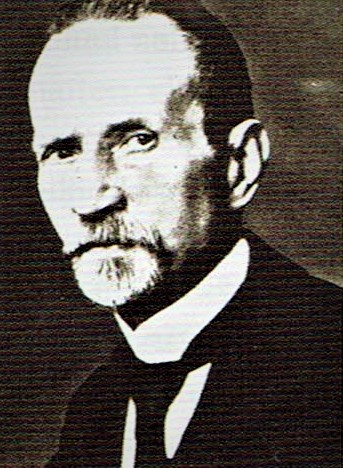

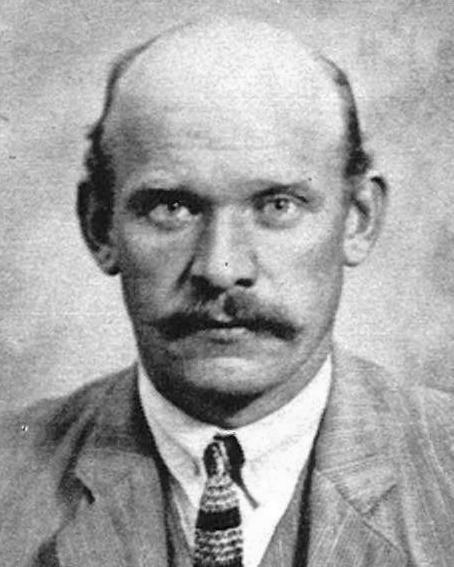

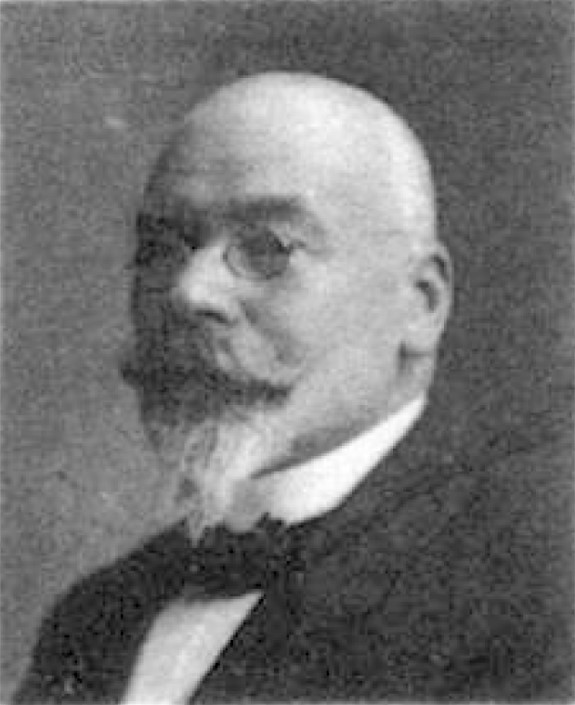

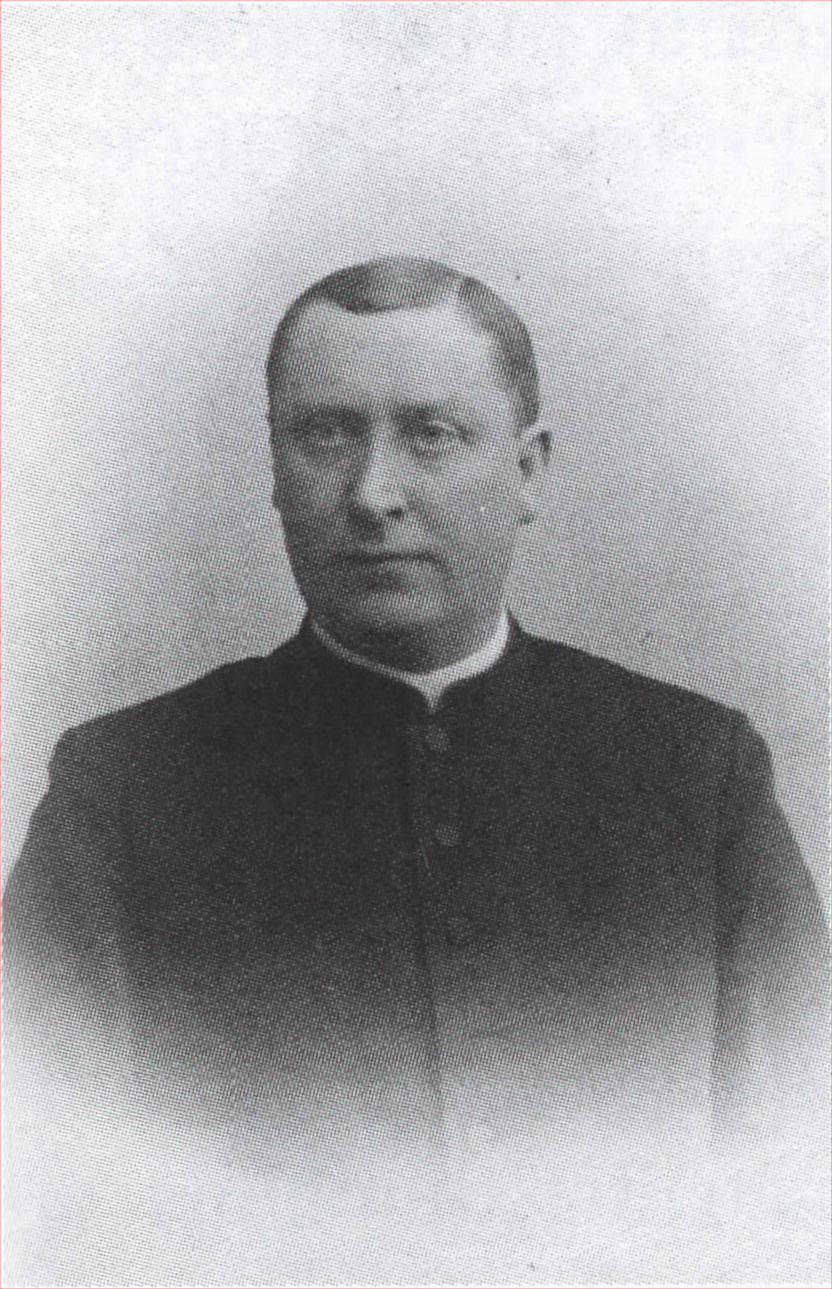

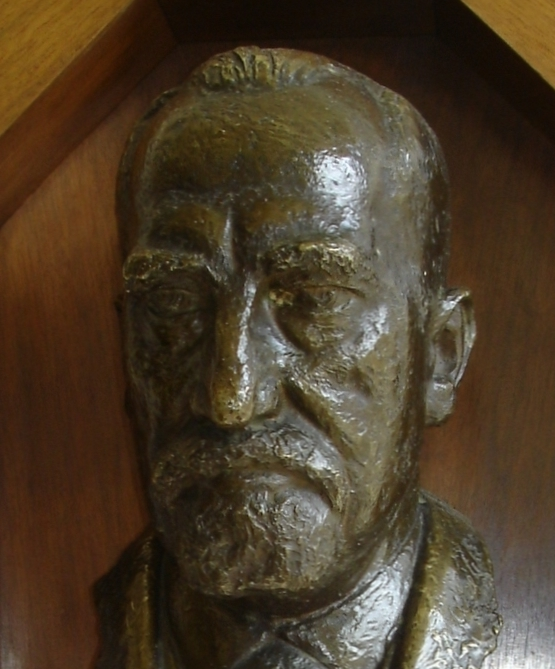
	First party	Second party	Third party
		Nöldeke	Rode
Leader	Otto Stolten	Arnold Nöldeke	Friedrich Rode
Party	SPD	DDP	DVP
Last election	10 seats	Did not exist	Did not exist
Seats won	82	33	13
Seat change	▲72	▲33	▲13
Popular vote	267,975	108,740	45,691
Percentage	50.5%	20.5%	8.6%
	Fourth party	Fifth party	Sixth party
		Beck
Leader	Ernst Thälmann	Hinrich Beck	Karl Anton Gutknecht
Party	USPD	Hamburgischer Wirtschaftsbund	DNVP
Last election	Did not exist	Did not exist	Did not exist
Seats won	13	7	4
Seat change	▲13	▲7	▲4
Popular vote	42,852	22,317	15,181
Percentage	2.5%	4.2%	2.9%
	Seventh party	Eighth party	Ninth party
	Fehmerling
Leader	Carl E. A. Fehmerling	Bernhard Dinkgrefe	Johannes Hirsch
Party	Grundeigentümer Wahlbüro	CVP	Hamburgische Wirtschaftspartei
Last election	Did not exist	Did not exist	Did not exist
Seats won	4	2	1
Seat change	▲4	▲2	▲1
Popular vote	13,013	6,387	2,250
Percentage	2.5%	1.2%	0.4%

The 1919 Hamburg state election was held on 16 March 1919 to elect the 160 members of the Hamburg Parliament. Despite the SPD winning an absolute majority, they still formed a coalition with the former members of the senate as well as the DDP in parliament, the SPD even allowed the incumbent independent mayor, Werner von Melle, to stay in office. It is regarded as the first fully democratic election in Hamburg since everyone, including women, were allowed to vote.

== Results ==
Party	Votes	%	Seats
Social Democratic Party of Germany	267,975	50.5	82
German Democratic Party	108,740	20.5	33
German People's Party	45,691	8.6	13
Independent Social Democratic Party of Germany	42,852	2.5	13
Hamburgischer Wirtschaftsbund	22,317	4.2	7
German National People's Party	15,181	2.9	4
Grundeigentümer Wahlbüro	13,013	2.5	4
Christian People's Party	6,387	1.2	2
Hamburgische Wirtschaftspartei	2,250	0.4	1
Vereinigte Bürgervereine der inneren Stadt	1,984	0.4	1
Heinrich Wilhelm Stamm	1,423	0.3	0
Friseur-Innung (Zwangsinnung) zu Hamburg	953	0.2	0
Hamburger Ausschuß für Leibesübungen	923	0.2	0
Erwerbstätige Frauen und Mädchen	822	0.2	0
Max Taube	589	0.1	0
Invalid/blank votes	1,811	–	–
Total	532,911	100	160
Registered voters/turnout	661,593	80.6	–
Source: Elections in the Weimar Republic
