= Lanškroun =

- Town
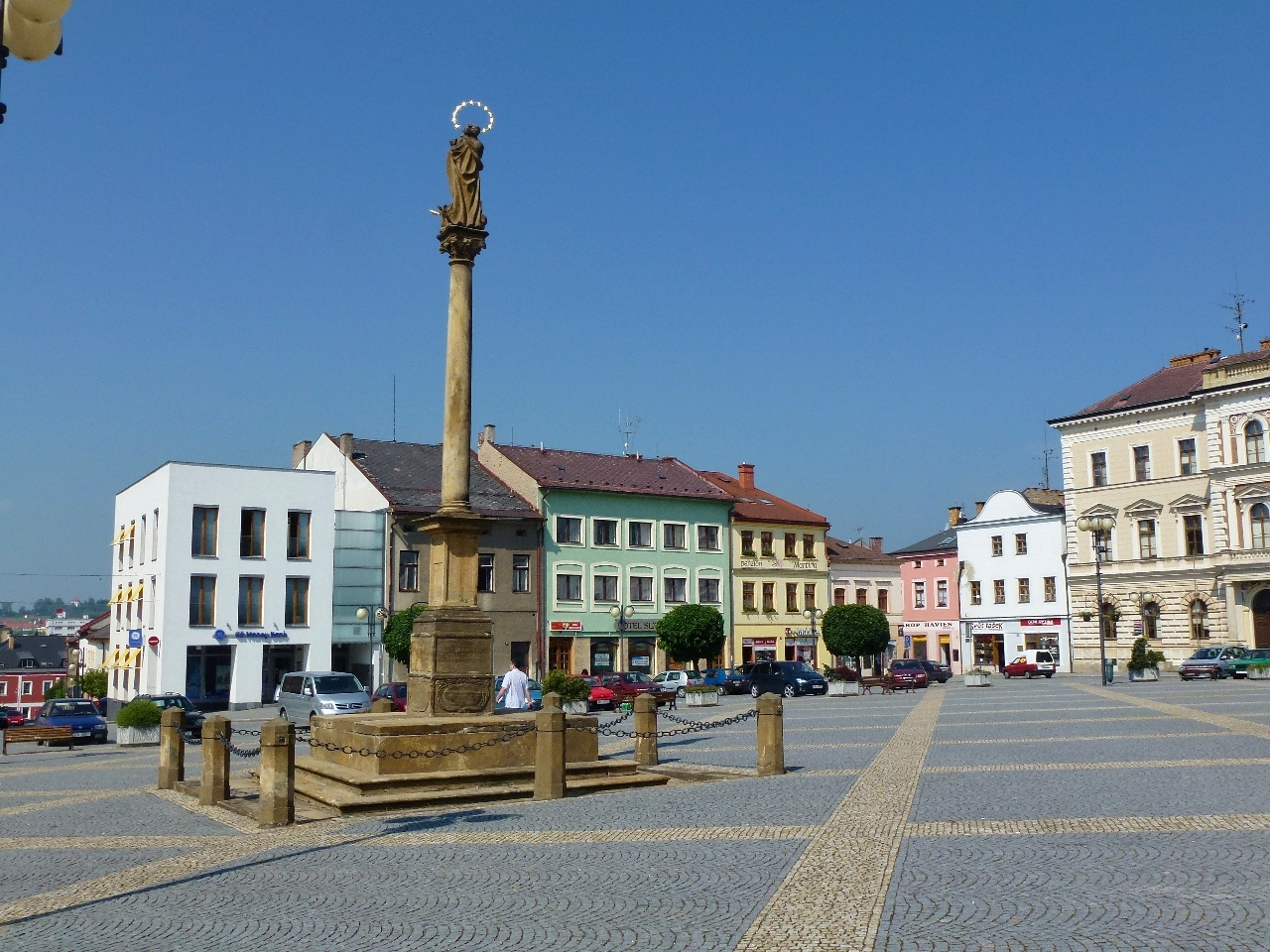
- The square Náměstí J. M. Marků

- Flag Coat of arms

- Location in the Czech Republic
- Coordinates: 49°54′44″N 16°36′44″E
- Country: Czech Republic
- Region: Pardubice
- District: Ústí nad Orlicí
- First mentioned: 1285

Government
  - Mayor: Petra Brejšová

Area
  - Total: 20.65 km^{2} (7.97 sq mi)
- Elevation: 373 m (1,224 ft)

Population (2026-01-01)
  - Total: 9,845
  - Density: 476.8/km^{2} (1,235/sq mi)
- Time zone: UTC+1 (CET)
  - Summer (DST): UTC+2 (CEST)
- Postal code: 563 01
- Website: www.lanskroun.eu

Lanškroun (Czech pronunciation: [ˈlanʃkroun]; German: Landskron) is a town in Ústí nad Orlicí District in the Pardubice Region of the Czech Republic. It has about 9,800 inhabitants. The town is located in the Orlické Foothills, on the border of the historical lands of Bohemia and Moravia. It is an industrial town with representation of the electronics, engineering and paper industries.

Lanškroun was founded in the second half of the 13th century. The historic town centre is well preserved and is protected as an urban monument zone. The main landmark of Lanškroun is the Renaissance town hall.

== Administrative division ==
Lanškroun consists of four municipal parts (in brackets population according to the 2021 census):

- Lanškroun-Vnitřní Město (488)
- Ostrovské Předměstí (2,670)
- Žichlínské Předměstí (5,437)
- Dolní Třešňovec (875)

== Etymology ==
The original historic name of Lanškroun was Landeskrone, meaning "Land's crown". It referred to its location on the border of the historical lands of Bohemia and Moravia.

== Geography ==
Lanškroun is located about 16 kilometres (10 mi) southeast of Ústí nad Orlicí and 60 km (37 mi) east of Pardubice. It lies in the Orlické Foothills. The highest point is at 449 m (1,473 ft) above sea level.

The stream Třešňovský potok flows through the town. In the northwestern part of the municipal territory is a system of six fishponds, supplied by the stream Ostrovský potok. The largest of them is Dlouhý rybník, used for recreational purposes and water sports. The northernmost ponds (Pšeničkův rybník and Olšový rybník) and the area around the stream Zadní potok before its confluence with the Ostrovský potok is protected as the Landškrounské rybníky Nature Reserve within the Lanškroun Ponds Nature Park. The Moravská Sázava River briefly crosses the territory of Lanškroun in the south, and the Ostrovský potok joins the Moravská Sázava there.

== History ==
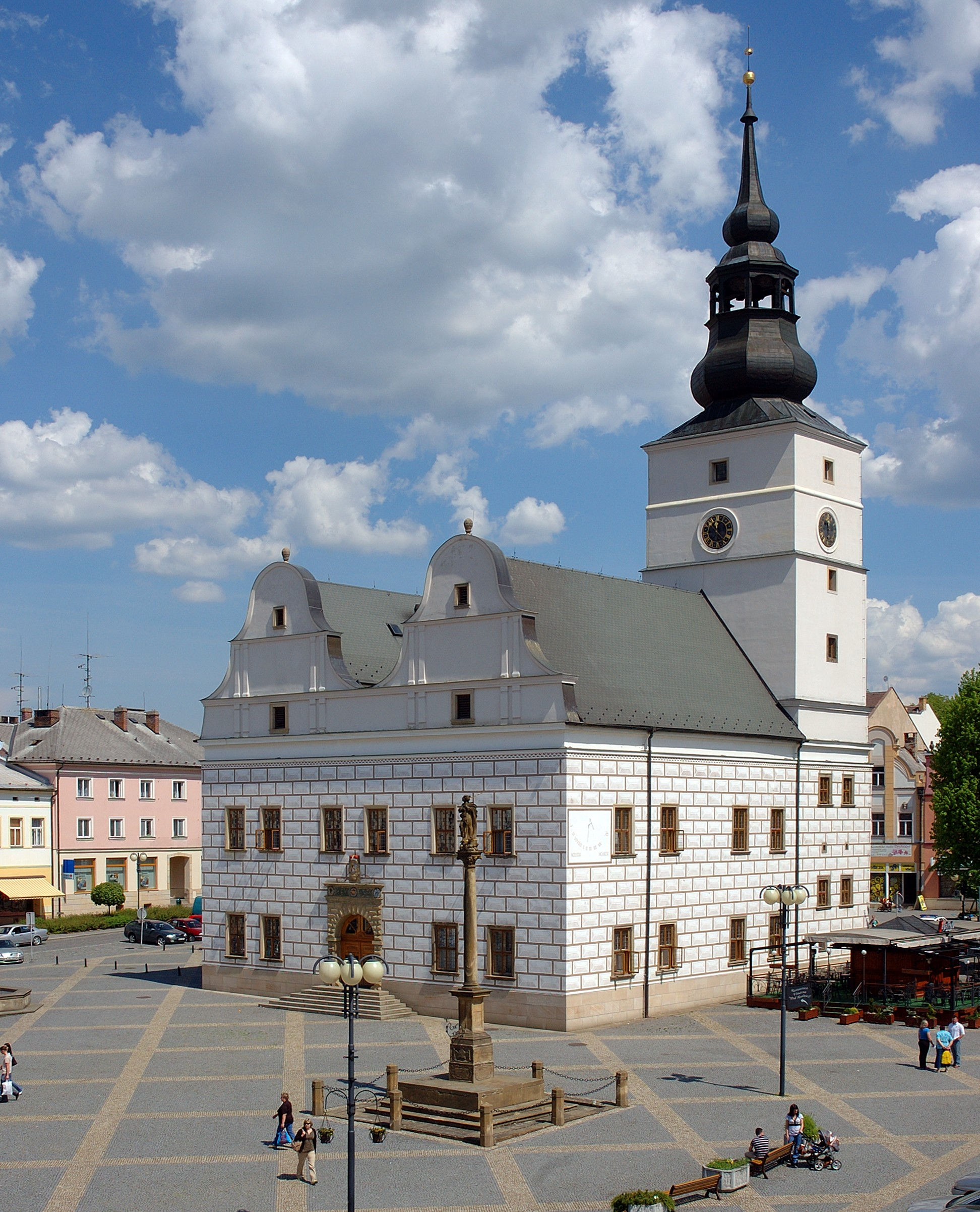
Town hall

The first written mention of Lanškroun is from 1285, when it was donated by King Wenceslaus II to Záviš of Falkenstein. Lanškroun was founded during the colonisation in the second half of the 13th century under the name Landeskrone. It became the economical centre of the large estate of Lanšperk and later of separate Lanškroun estate.

In 1304, Lanškroun property of the Zbraslav Monastery and in 1358, it was acquired by Litomyšl bishopric. In 1371, an Augustinian monastery was founded. In 1421, the town was conquered by Jan Žižka. After the Hussite Wars, the estate was acquired by the noble family of Kostka of Postupice. It began to prosper and obtained various privileges. In 1507, it was bought by the Pernštejn family. Then it was shortly held by the Hrzáns of Harasov, and after the Battle of White Mountain, it was bought by the Liechtenstein family.

During the Thirty Years' War, the town was repeatedly burned down and looted by the Swedish army and the Catholicisation began. After the war, the population was significantly decreased. It was repopulated by German settlers and in 1683, German has become the official language.

During the 18th century, Lanškroun was an average serf town. In 1848, the serfdom was abolished and Lanškroun became a district town. In the 1870s, the industrialisation began. The railway was built in 1884–1885.

Until 1918, the town was part of Austria-Hungary. In 1918, it became part of Czechoslovakia. In 1938, it was occupied by Nazi German troops according to the Munich Agreement. From 1939 to 1945, it was administered as part of the Reichsgau Sudetenland.

Shortly after the end of World War II, on 17 May 1945, the event known as the Lanškroun Massacre or Lanškroun Blood Court happened. Czech partisans drove all the Germans into the town square. Several hundred Germans had to stand there with their hands above their heads and 31 of them were sentenced to death by a self-proclaimed people's court. It was a retribution for the atrocities against the Czech population during the war, which, according to historians, got out of control.

Until the expulsion of the German-speaking population from Lanškroun in 1946, the majority of population of the town had been German. After the expulsion, the town became completely Czech. In 1945, it ceased to be a district town.

== Demographics ==
Historical population

Year	Pop.	±%
1869	5,590	—
1880	5,893	+5.4%
1890	6,511	+10.5%
1900	6,820	+4.7%
1910	7,624	+11.8%

Year	Pop.	±%
1921	7,241	−5.0%
1930	7,164	−1.1%
1950	6,021	−16.0%
1961	7,661	+27.2%
1970	8,702	+13.6%

Year	Pop.	±%
1980	9,593	+10.2%
1991	9,873	+2.9%
2001	9,990	+1.2%
2011	10,159	+1.7%
2021	9,470	−6.8%

Source: Censuses

== Economy ==
Lanškroun is an industrial town. The most important sectors are the electronics industry, engineering and paper industry. The largest employers are Kyocera AVX Component and Schott CR (both manufacturers of electronic components), and Schaeffler Production CZ (manufacturer of rolling element bearings).

== Transport ==
The I/43 road from Brno and Svitavy to the Czech–Polish border in Králíky runs through the town.

Lanškroun is the terminus and start of the railway line heading from/to Česká Třebová.

== Sights ==
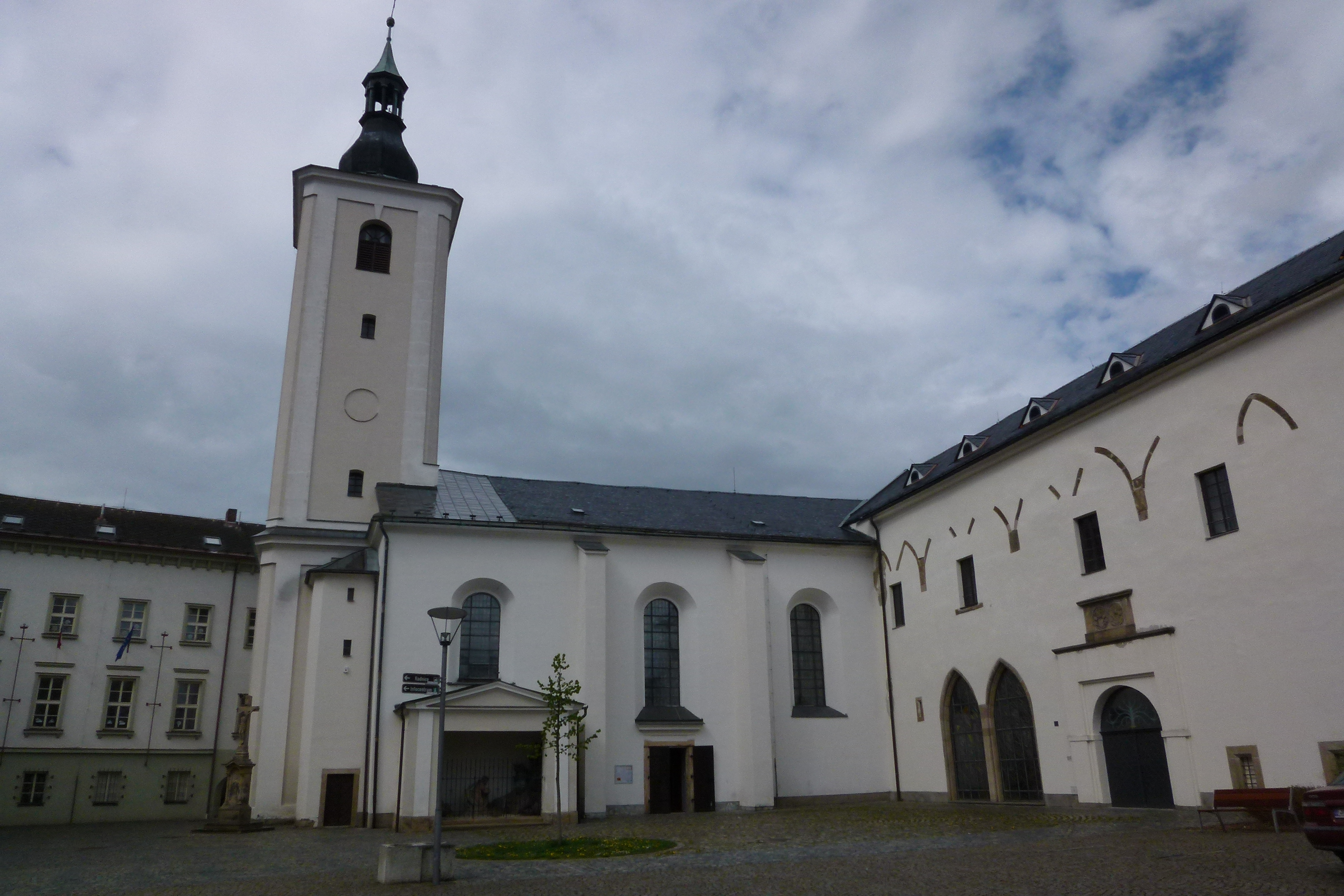
Church of Saint Wenceslaus and Lanškroun Castle

Lanškroun is known for its large Renaissance town hall, which is one of the symbols of the town. It was built in 1581–1582. The two original Renaissance portals are preserved.

The original monastery from the 14th century was rebuilt into a Renaissance castle. The reconstruction was completed in 1601. From the 1650s to 1716, it was rebuilt to its current appearance. Today it houses the town museum. The Church of Saint Wenceslaus is adjacent to the castle and stood here before the founding of the monastery. It was first mentioned in 1350 and originally was consecrated to the Virgin Mary. It was reconstructed several times; the tower was added in 1768.

== Notable people ==
- Jan Marek Marci (1595–1667), physician and scientist
- Josef Johann Steinmann (1779–1833), Austrian pharmacist and chemist
- Friedrich Gustav Piffl (1864–1932), Cardinal and Archbishop of Vienna
- Herwig Schopper (1924–2025), Czech-German experimental physicist
- Jan Smejkal (born 1946), chess player
- Jan Ambrož (born 1954), chess player
- Ludmila Müllerová (born 1954), politician
- Robert Dušek (born 1967), politician
- Roman Šebrle (born 1974), decathlete, Olympic winner

== Twin towns – sister cities ==
Lanškroun is twinned with:

- Castiglione in Teverina, Italy
- Dzierżoniów, Poland
- Hajdúszoboszló, Hungary
- Kežmarok, Slovakia
- Serock, Poland
