= Albrechtice =

Albrechtice may refer to places in the Czech Republic:

- Albrechtice (Karviná District), a municipality and village in the Moravian-Silesian Region
- Albrechtice (Ústí nad Orlicí District), a municipality and village in the Pardubice Region
- Albrechtice, a village and part of Drahonice in the South Bohemian Region
- Albrechtice, a village and part of Malešov in the Central Bohemian Region
- Albrechtice, a village and part of Pěnčín (Liberec District) in the Liberec Region
- Albrechtice, a village and part of Rozsochy in the Vysočina Region
- Albrechtice, a village and part of Sušice in the Plzeň Region
- Albrechtice nad Orlicí, a municipality and village in the Hradec Králové Region
- Albrechtice nad Vltavou, a municipality and village in the South Bohemian Region
- Albrechtice u Frýdlantu, a village and part of Frýdlant in the Liberec Region
- Albrechtice u Rýmařova, a village and part of Rýmařov in the Moravian-Silesian Region
- Albrechtice v Jizerských horách, a municipality and village in the Liberec Region
- Město Albrechtice, a town in the Moravian-Silesian Region
- Velké Albrechtice, a municipality and village in the Moravian-Silesian Region

== See also ==
- Albrechtičky, a municipality and village in Moravian-Silesian Region
