= Moravská Sázava =

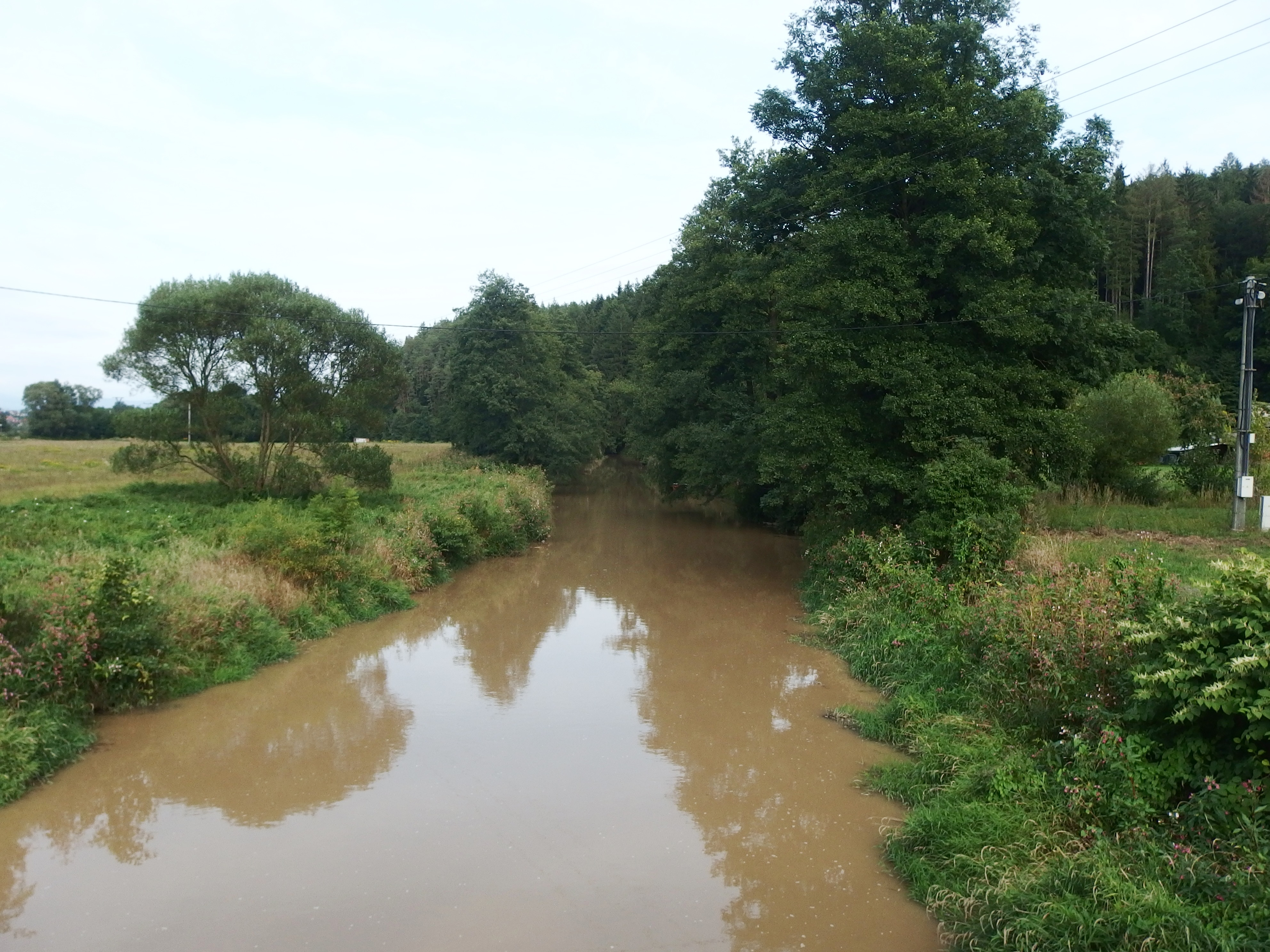
- The Moravská Sázava in Nemile-Lupěné

Location
- Country: Czech Republic
- Regions: Pardubice; Olomouc

Physical characteristics
- Source
  - location: Výprachtice, Orlické Mountains
  - coordinates: 50°0′20″N 16°41′55″E
  - elevation: 805 m (2,641 ft)
- Mouth
  - location: Morava
  - coordinates: 49°37′56″N 17°14′45″E
  - elevation: 277 m (909 ft)
- Length: 53.9 km (33.5 mi)
- Basin size: 510.6 km^{2} (197.1 sq mi)
- Discharge
  - average: 4.52 m^{3}/s (160 cu ft/s) near estuary

Basin features
- Progression: Morava→ Danube→ Black Sea

The Moravská Sázava (Czech pronunciation: [ˈmorafskaː ˈsaːzava]) is a river in the Czech Republic, a right tributary of the Morava River. It flows through the Pardubice and Olomouc regions. It is 53.9 km (33.5 mi) long.

== Etymology ==
There are several theories about the origin of the name. One of the more likely theories says that the name could be derived from the Proto-Slavic verb sadjati (modern Czech sázet, usazovat), meaning 'to sediment', 'to sink to the bottom'. According to another theory, the name has its basis in the Celtic word sathá, which meant 'grove', 'forest', as well as 'swarming', 'flickering'. The prefix "Moravská" (indicating its affiliation both to Moravia and to the Morava River) distinguishes the river from the Sázava River.

== Characteristic ==
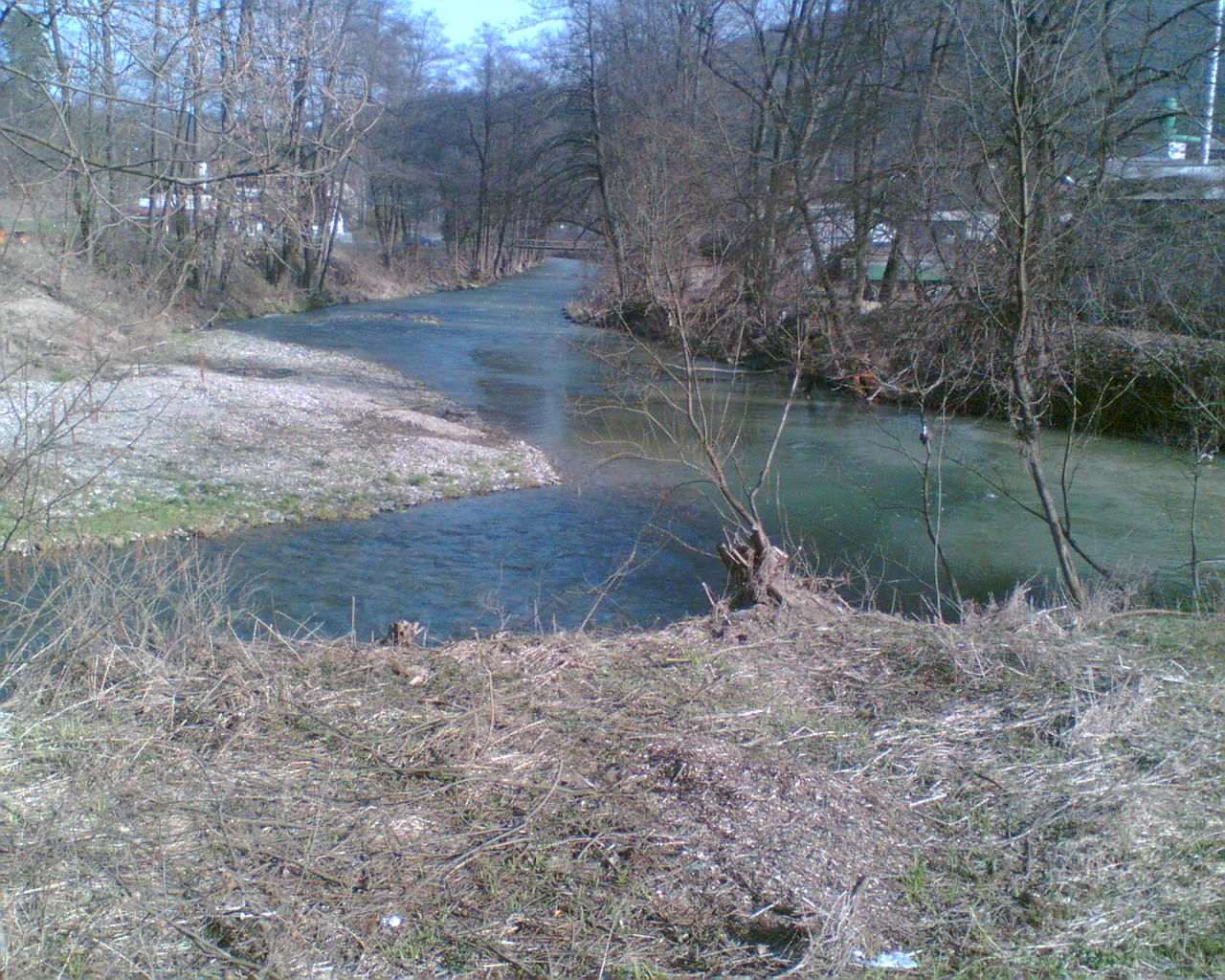
Confluence of the Moravská Sázava and Březná

The Moravská Sázava originates in the territory of Výprachtice in the Orlické Mountains at the elevation of 805 m (2,641 ft) and flows to Zvole, where it enters the Morava River at an elevation of 277 m (909 ft). It is 53.9 km (33.5 mi) long. Its drainage basin has an area of 510.6 km^{2} (197.1 sq mi). The average discharge at its mouth is 4.52 m^{3}/s.

The longest tributaries of the Moravská Sázava are:

Tributary	Length (km)	Side
Březná	31.8	left
Lukovský potok	14.7	right
Hraniční potok	13.9	left
Nemilka	12.5	left
Ostrovský potok	12.1	right
Ospitský potok	9.3	right
Třebařovský potok	9.2	right

== Course ==
The most populated settlement on the river is the town of Zábřeh. The river flows through the municipal territories of Výprachtice, Horní Čermná, Albrechtice, Sázava, Lanškroun, Žichlínek, Rychnov na Moravě, Třebařov, Krasíkov, Tatenice, Hoštejn, Hynčina, Kosov, Nemile, Zábřeh, Rájec and Zvole.

== Bodies of water ==
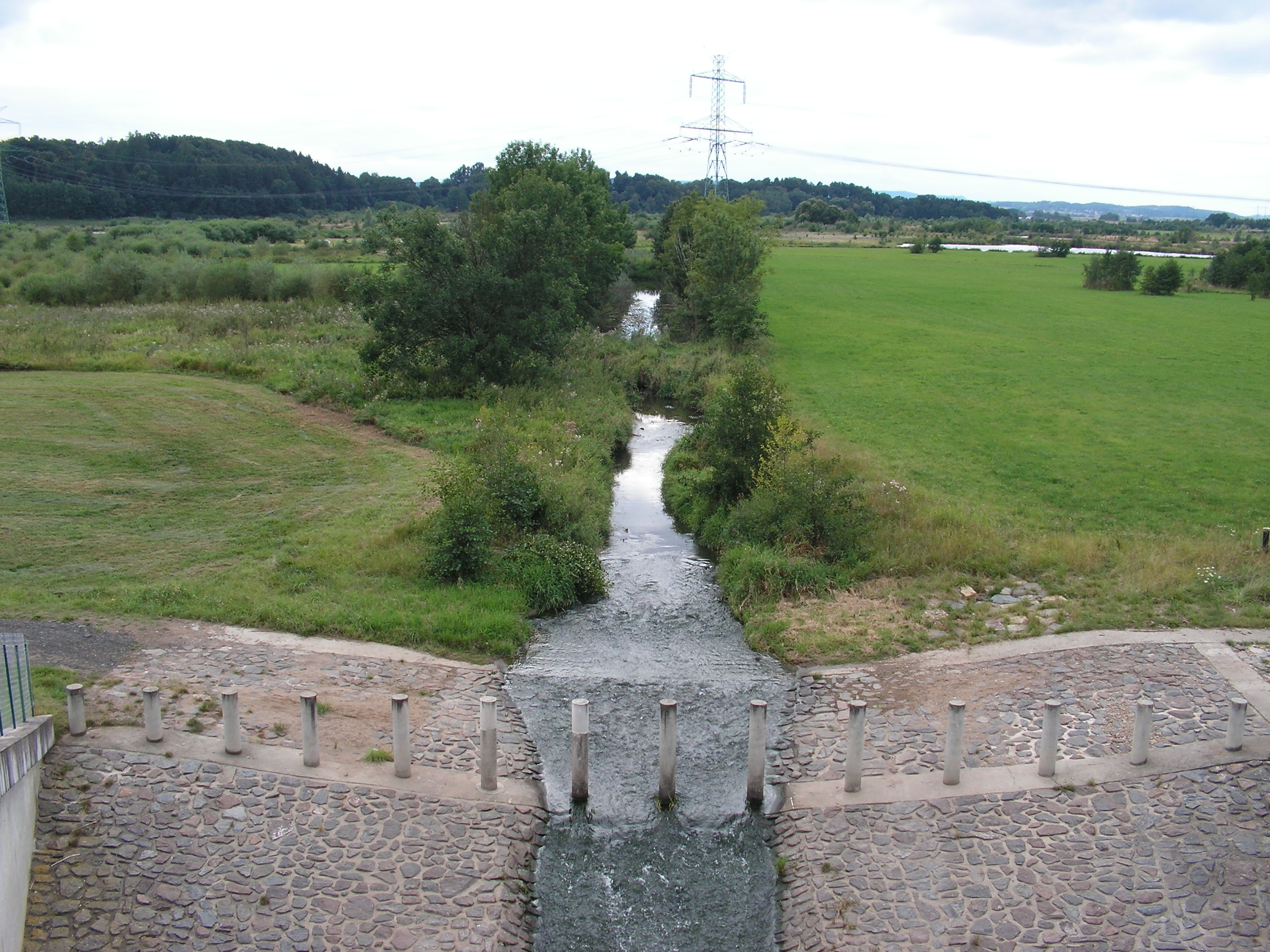
Žichlínek Detention Basin

There are 169 bodies of water in the basin area. The largest of them is the Nemilka Reservoir with an area of 18.9 ha (47 acres), built on the Nemilka Stream. No reservoirs or fishponds are built directly on the Moravská Sázava. A notable construction is the dry detention basin Žichlínek, which is the largest detention basin in the Czech Republic. It was built on the river in 2008 as flood protection, after the region was severely hit by the 1997 Central European flood. It has an area of 166 ha (410 acres).

== Nature ==
Moravská Sázava is also the name of a Special Area of Conservation with an area of 353.4 ha (873 acres). It is a floodplain of the river and a forested landscape next to the river, located on the upper course of the river.

== See also ==
- List of rivers of the Czech Republic
