= Sázava =

Sázava may refer to places in the Czech Republic:

- Sázava (river)
- Sázava (town), a town in the Central Bohemian Region
  - Sázava Monastery in the town
- Sázava (Ústí nad Orlicí District), a municipality and village in the Pardubice Region
- Sázava (Žďár nad Sázavou District), a municipality and village in the Vysočina Region
- Sázava, a village and part of Davle in the Central Bohemian Region
- Sázava, a village and part of Nový Rychnov in the Vysočina Region

== See also ==
- Moravská Sázava, a river
- Procopius of Sázava, Czech saint
