= Výprachtice =

- Municipality
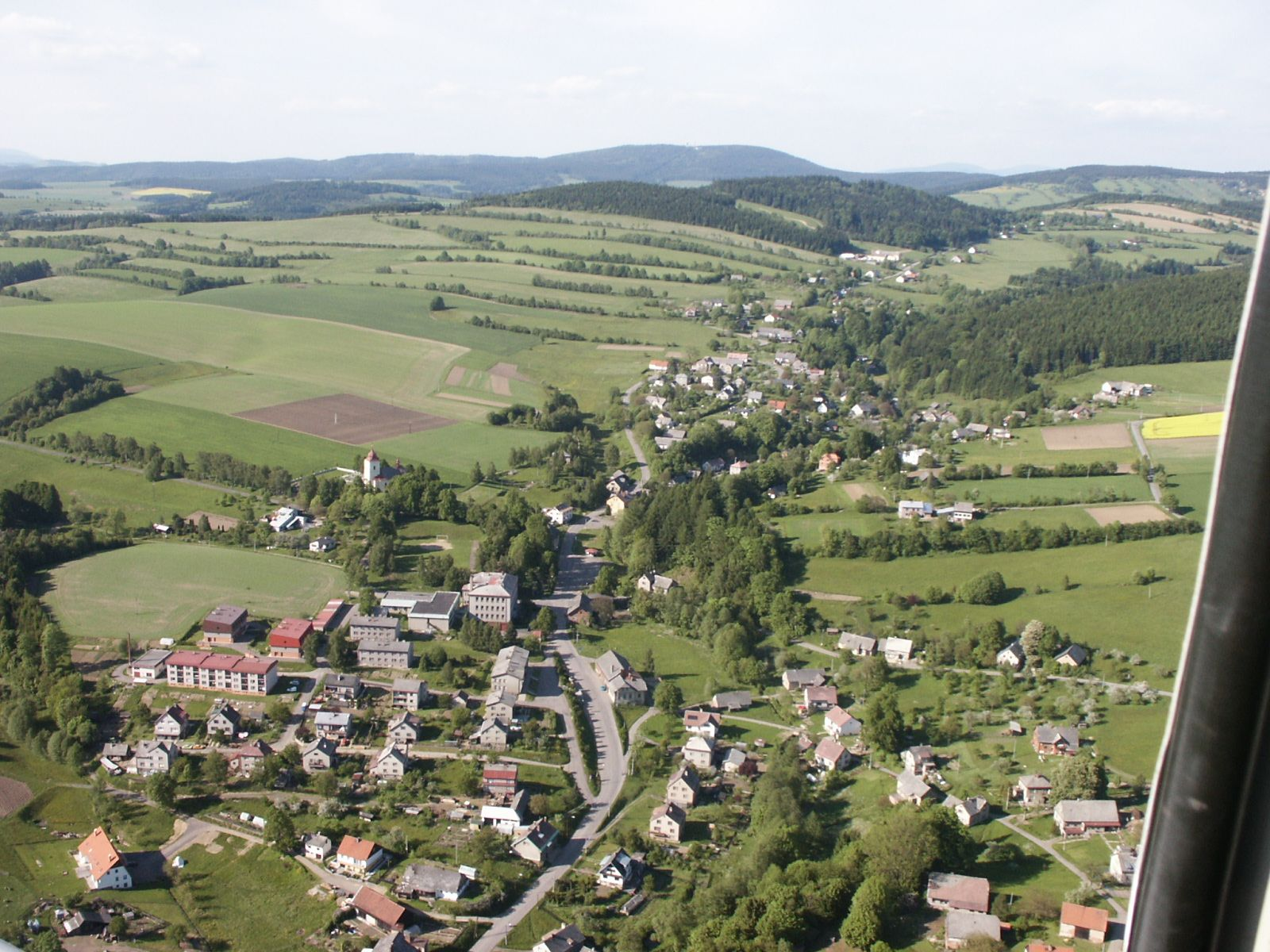
- Aerial view

- Flag Coat of arms

- Location in the Czech Republic
- Coordinates: 49°59′14″N 16°39′50″E
- Country: Czech Republic
- Region: Pardubice
- District: Ústí nad Orlicí
- First mentioned: 1304

Area
  - Total: 21.71 km^{2} (8.38 sq mi)
- Elevation: 587 m (1,926 ft)

Population (2026-01-01)
  - Total: 947
  - Density: 43.6/km^{2} (113/sq mi)
- Time zone: UTC+1 (CET)
  - Summer (DST): UTC+2 (CEST)
- Postal code: 561 34
- Website: www.obec-vyprachtice.cz

Výprachtice (German: Weipersdorf) is a municipality and village in Ústí nad Orlicí District in the Pardubice Region of the Czech Republic. It has about 900 inhabitants. The Moravská Sázava River originates in the territory of Výprachtice.

== Administrative division ==
Výprachtice consists of three municipal parts (in brackets population according to the 2021 census):

- Výprachtice (842)
- Koburk (97)
- Valteřice (3)

== Demographics ==
Historical population
| Year | Pop. | ±% |
|---|---|---|
| 1869 | 3,258 | — |
| 1880 | 3,211 | −1.4% |
| 1890 | 3,035 | −5.5% |
| 1900 | 2,611 | −14.0% |
| 1910 | 2,308 | −11.6% |
| 1921 | 2,251 | −2.5% |
| 1930 | 1,956 | −13.1% |
| 1950 | 1,096 | −44.0% |
| 1961 | 1,020 | −6.9% |
| 1970 | 877 | −14.0% |
| 1980 | 947 | +8.0% |
| 1991 | 918 | −3.1% |
| 2001 | 953 | +3.8% |
| 2011 | 973 | +2.1% |
| 2021 | 942 | −3.2% |
Source: Censuses
