= František Hoplíček =

Czech discus thrower

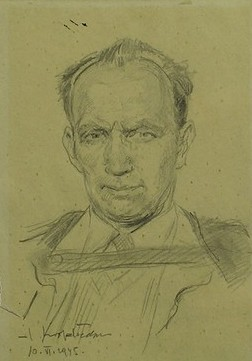
- Self-portrait

Personal information
- Nationality: Czech
- Born: 23 April 1890 Zvole, Austria-Hungary
- Died: 13 April 1946 (aged 55) Olomouc, Czechoslovakia

Sport
- Sport: Athletics
- Event: Discus throw

František Hoplíček (23 April 1890 – 13 April 1946) was a Czech painter and athlete. He competed in the men's discus throw at the 1920 Summer Olympics. He also competed in the art competition at the 1932 Summer Olympics.
