= Žichlínek =

- Municipality
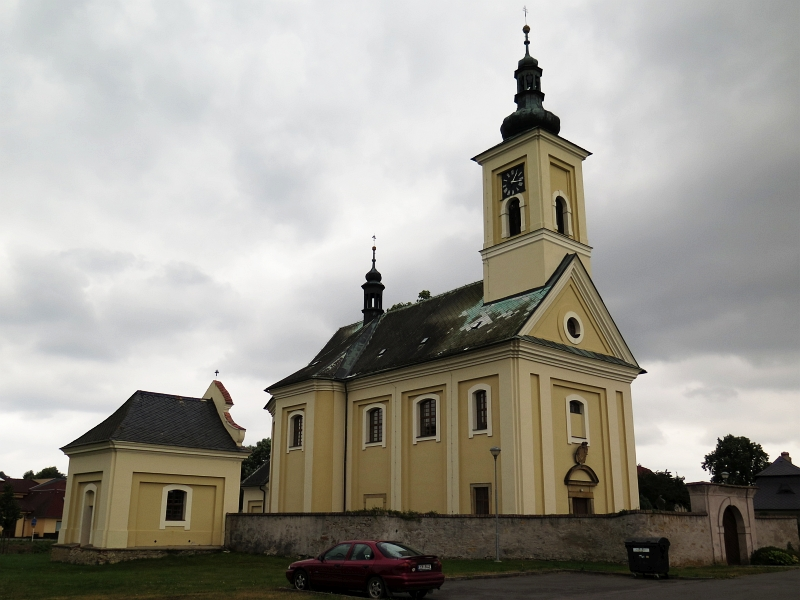
- Church of the Nativity of Saint John the Baptist

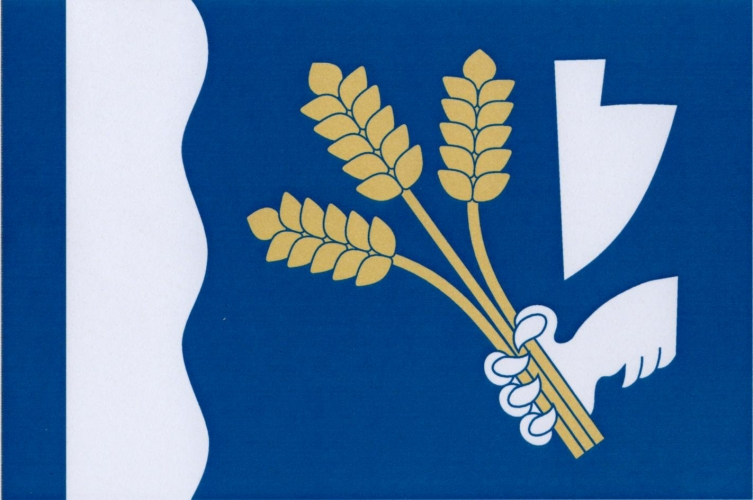
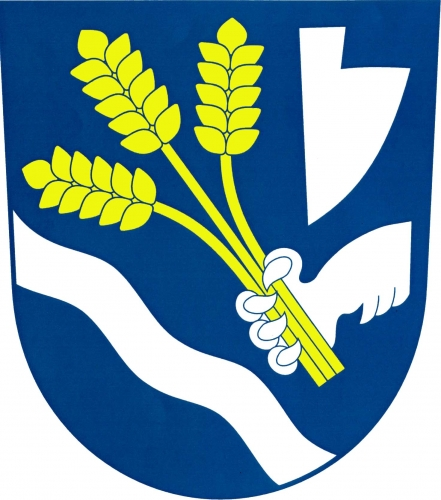
- Flag Coat of arms

- Location in the Czech Republic
- Coordinates: 49°53′2″N 16°38′11″E
- Country: Czech Republic
- Region: Pardubice
- District: Ústí nad Orlicí
- First mentioned: 1304

Area
  - Total: 10.76 km^{2} (4.15 sq mi)
- Elevation: 348 m (1,142 ft)

Population (2026-01-01)
  - Total: 988
  - Density: 91.8/km^{2} (238/sq mi)
- Time zone: UTC+1 (CET)
  - Summer (DST): UTC+2 (CEST)
- Postal code: 563 01
- Website: www.zichlinek.eu

Žichlínek (German: Sichelsdorf) is a municipality and village in Ústí nad Orlicí District in the Pardubice Region of the Czech Republic. It has about 1,000 inhabitants.

Žichlínek lies approximately 21 kilometres (13 mi) south-east of Ústí nad Orlicí, 65 km (40 mi) east of Pardubice, and 161 km (100 mi) east of Prague.

== Demographics ==
Historical population
Year	Pop.	±%
1869	949	—
1880	909	−4.2%
1890	895	−1.5%
1900	877	−2.0%
1910	861	−1.8%
1921	844	−2.0%
1930	806	−4.5%
1950	563	−30.1%
1961	655	+16.3%
1970	631	−3.7%
1980	694	+10.0%
1991	707	+1.9%
2001	793	+12.2%
2011	869	+9.6%
2021	971	+11.7%
Source: Censuses
