= Albrechtičky =

- Municipality
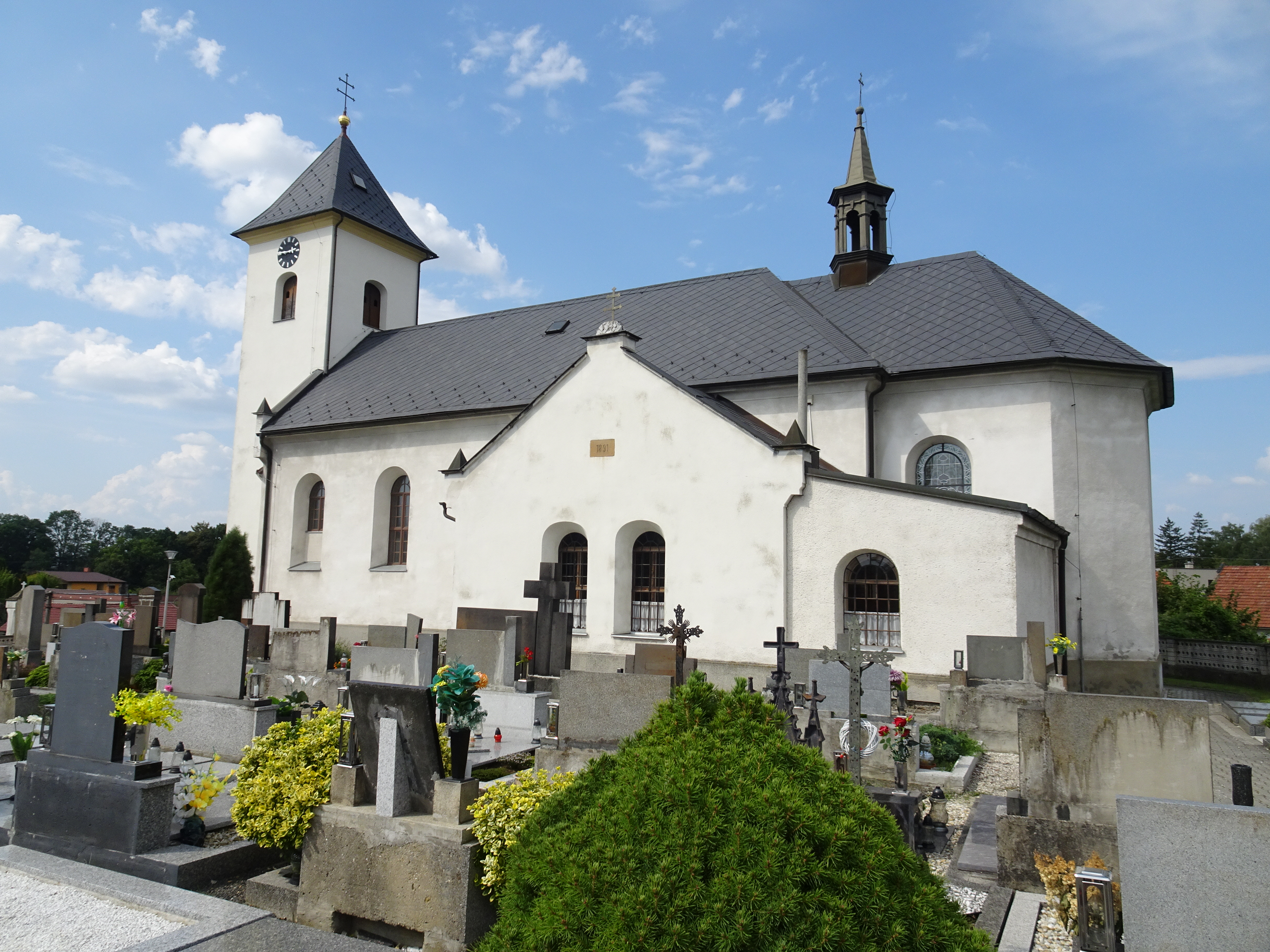
- Church of Saint Nicholas

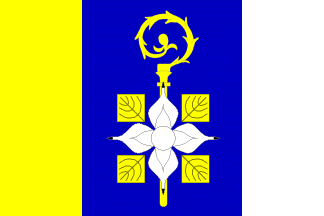
- Flag Coat of arms

- Location in the Czech Republic
- Coordinates: 49°42′6″N 18°5′44″E
- Country: Czech Republic
- Region: Moravian-Silesian
- District: Nový Jičín
- First mentioned: 1408

Area
  - Total: 3.96 km^{2} (1.53 sq mi)
- Elevation: 241 m (791 ft)

Population (2026-01-01)
  - Total: 693
  - Density: 175/km^{2} (453/sq mi)
- Time zone: UTC+1 (CET)
  - Summer (DST): UTC+2 (CEST)
- Postal code: 742 55
- Website: www.albrechticky.cz

Albrechtičky (German: Klein Olbersdorf) is a municipality and village in Nový Jičín District in the Moravian-Silesian Region of the Czech Republic. It has about 700 inhabitants.

== Geography ==
Albrechtičky is located about 13 kilometres (8 mi) northeast of Nový Jičín and 16 km (9.9 mi) southwest of Ostrava. It lies in a flat landscape in the Moravian Gate. The Oder River flows along the northern municipal border. Along the Oder are several fishponds, supplied by this river. The northern half of the municipal territory extends into the Poodří Protected Landscape Area.

== Demographics ==
Historical population
Year	Pop.	±%
1869	746	—
1880	745	−0.1%
1890	728	−2.3%
1900	757	+4.0%
1910	861	+13.7%
1921	876	+1.7%
1930	861	−1.7%
1950	1,009	+17.2%
1961	1,188	+17.7%
1970	787	−33.8%
1980	726	−7.8%
1991	698	−3.9%
2001	693	−0.7%
2011	684	−1.3%
2021	667	−2.5%
Source: Censuses

== Transport ==
The area of Leoš Janáček Airport Ostrava partially lies in the municipal territory.
