= Krasíkov =

- Municipality
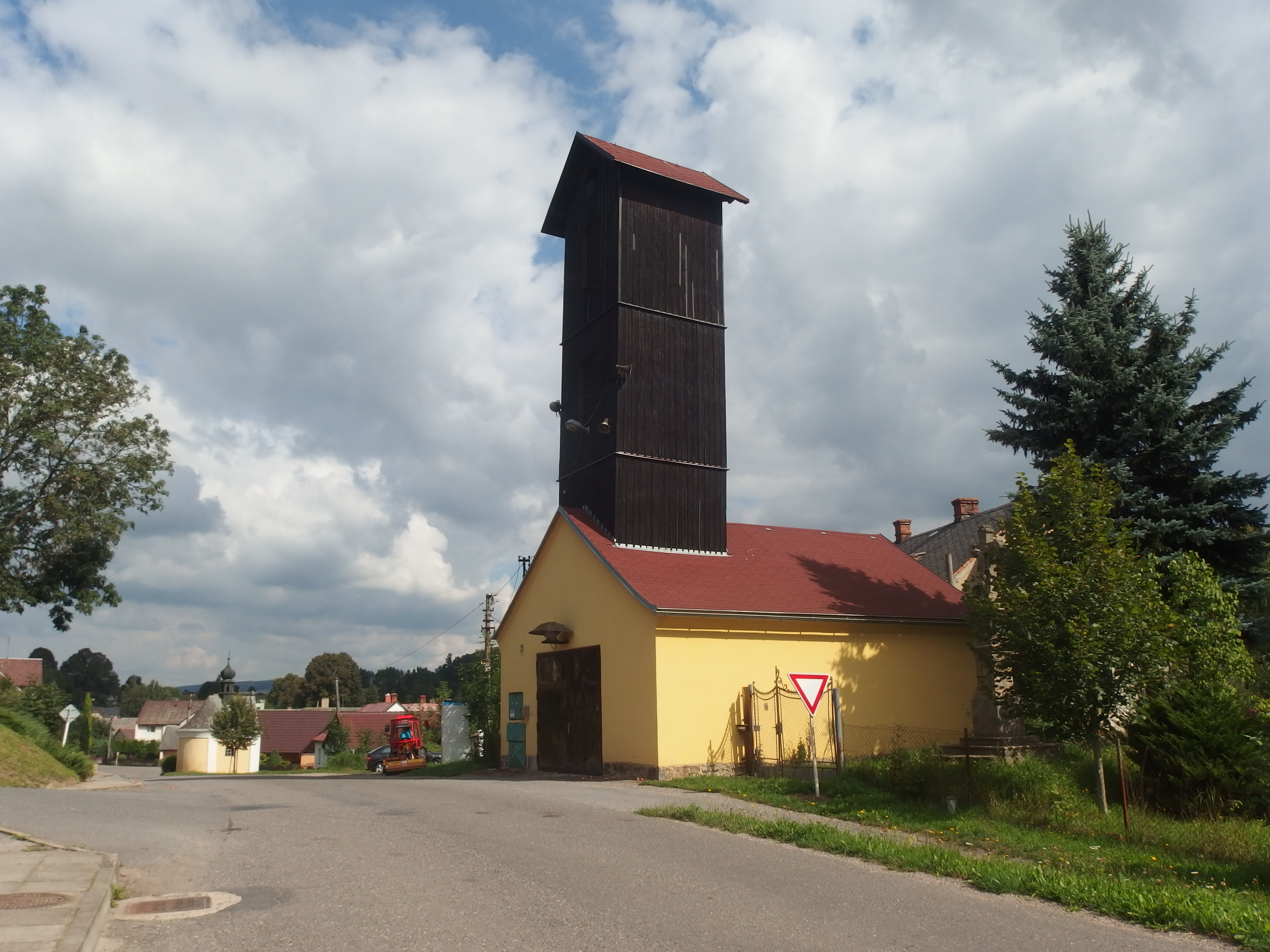
- Firehouse

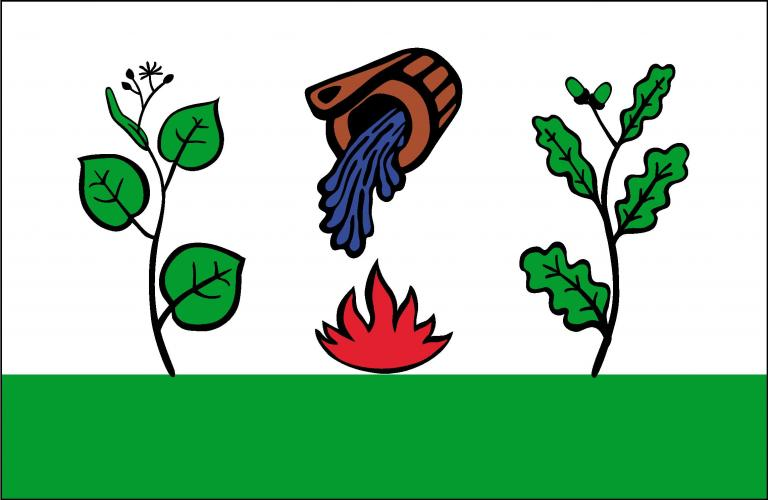
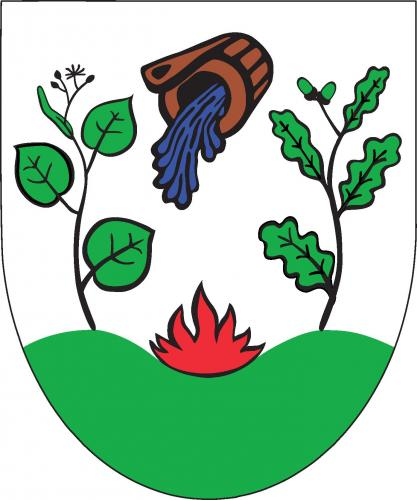
- Flag Coat of arms

- Location in the Czech Republic
- Coordinates: 49°51′20″N 16°41′45″E
- Country: Czech Republic
- Region: Pardubice
- District: Ústí nad Orlicí
- First mentioned: 1267

Area
  - Total: 5.10 km^{2} (1.97 sq mi)
- Elevation: 330 m (1,080 ft)

Population (2026-01-01)
  - Total: 313
  - Density: 61.4/km^{2} (159/sq mi)
- Time zone: UTC+1 (CET)
  - Summer (DST): UTC+2 (CEST)
- Postal code: 563 01
- Website: www.obec-krasikov.cz

Krasíkov (German: Budigsdorf) is a municipality and village in Ústí nad Orlicí District in the Pardubice Region of the Czech Republic. It has about 300 inhabitants.

Krasíkov lies approximately 26 kilometres (16 mi) south-east of Ústí nad Orlicí, 69 km (43 mi) east of Pardubice, and 166 km (103 mi) east of Prague.

== Demographics ==
Historical population
Year	Pop.	±%
1869	695	—
1880	659	−5.2%
1890	677	+2.7%
1900	568	−16.1%
1910	583	+2.6%
1921	578	−0.9%
1930	561	−2.9%
1950	372	−33.7%
1961	443	+19.1%
1970	396	−10.6%
1980	366	−7.6%
1991	334	−8.7%
2001	305	−8.7%
2011	325	+6.6%
2021	292	−10.2%
Source: Censuses
