= Zvole (Šumperk District) =

- Municipality
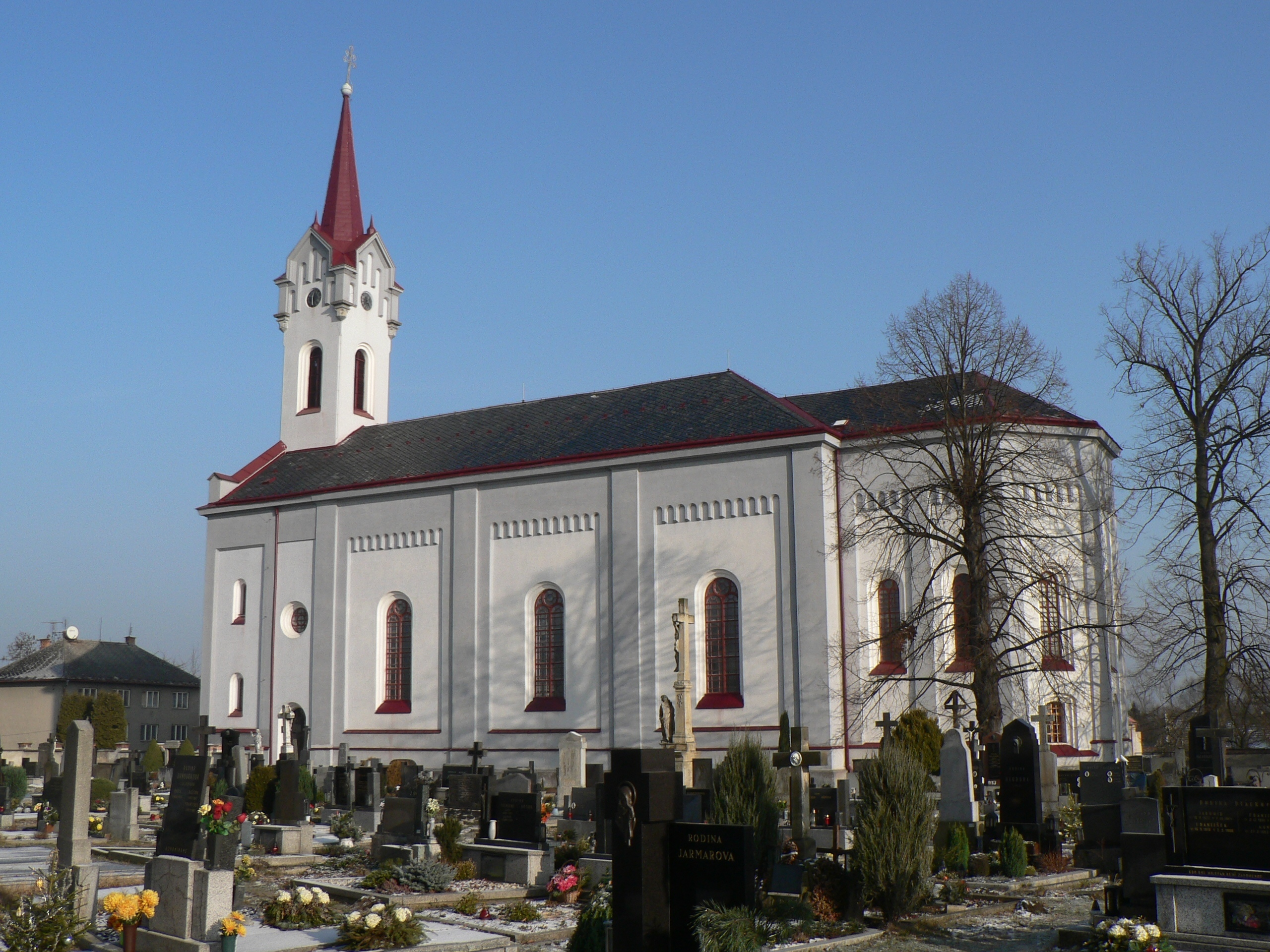
- Church of the Immaculate Conception

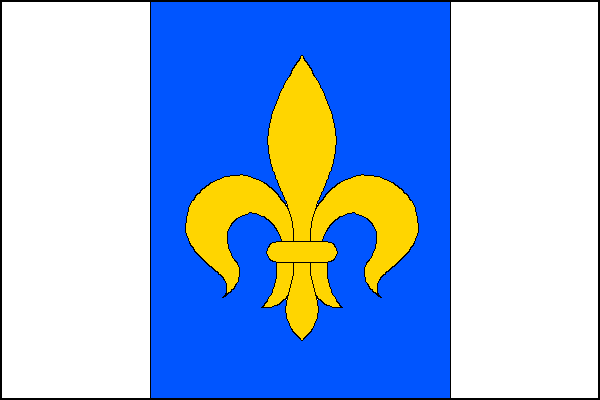
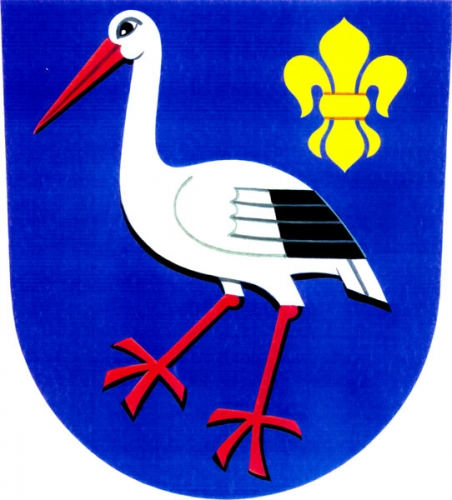
- Flag Coat of arms

- Location in the Czech Republic
- Coordinates: 49°50′23″N 16°54′52″E
- Country: Czech Republic
- Region: Olomouc
- District: Šumperk
- First mentioned: 1273

Area
  - Total: 6.56 km^{2} (2.53 sq mi)
- Elevation: 265 m (869 ft)

Population (2026-01-01)
  - Total: 857
  - Density: 131/km^{2} (338/sq mi)
- Time zone: UTC+1 (CET)
  - Summer (DST): UTC+2 (CEST)
- Postal codes: 789 01
- Website: www.obec-zvole.cz

Zvole (German: Schmole) is a municipality and village in Šumperk District in the Olomouc Region of the Czech Republic. It has about 900 inhabitants.

Zvole lies approximately 15 kilometres (9 mi) south of Šumperk, 37 km (23 mi) north-west of Olomouc, and 181 km (112 mi) east of Prague.

== Demographics ==
Historical population
Year	Pop.	±%
1869	926	—
1880	914	−1.3%
1890	919	+0.5%
1900	985	+7.2%
1910	963	−2.2%
1921	971	+0.8%
1930	938	−3.4%
1950	750	−20.0%
1961	767	+2.3%
1970	739	−3.7%
1980	704	−4.7%
1991	704	+0.0%
2001	781	+10.9%
2011	789	+1.0%
2021	798	+1.1%
Source: Censuses

== Notable people ==
- František Hoplíček (1890–1946), painter and athlete
