= Drahonice =

- Municipality
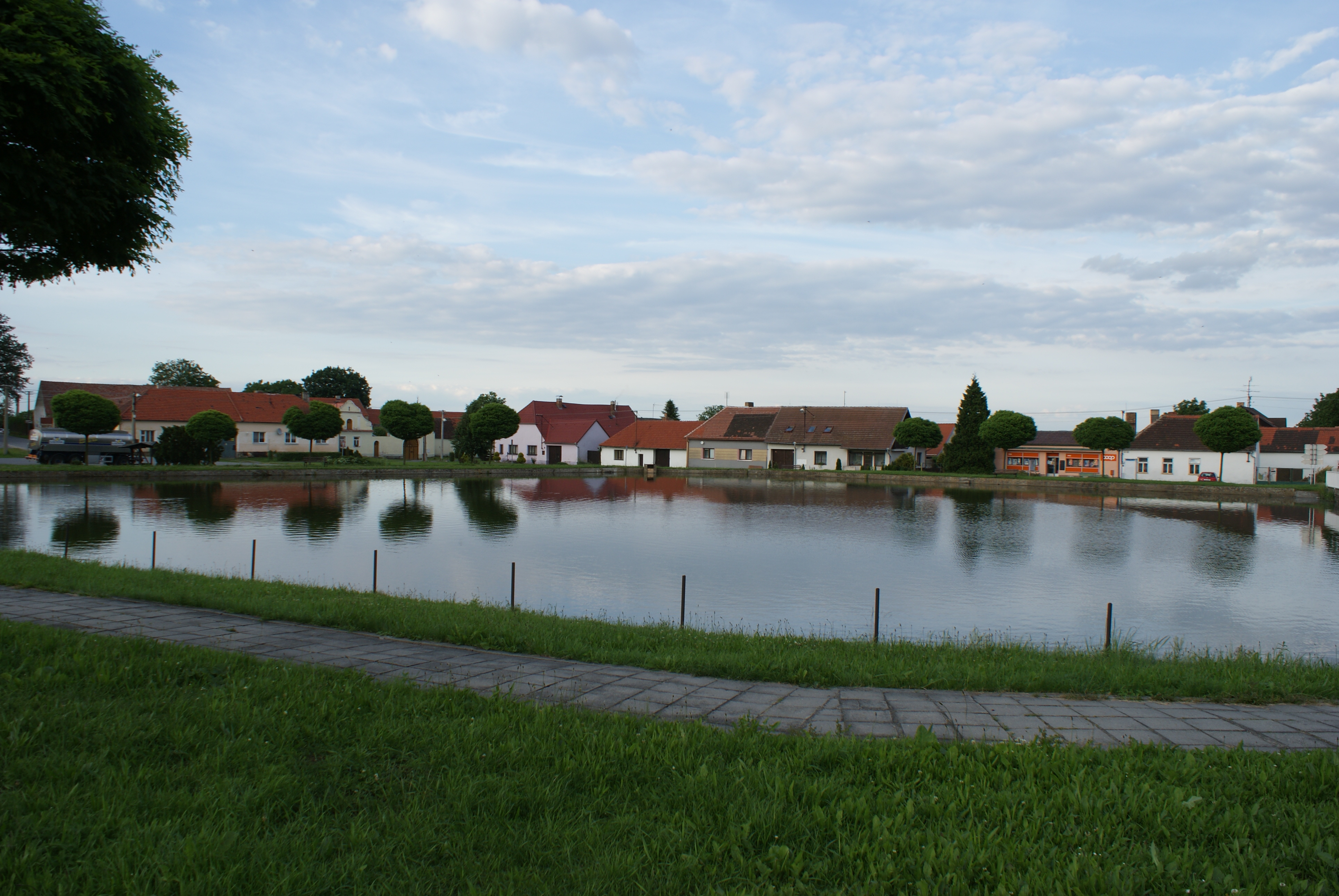
- Centre of Drahonice

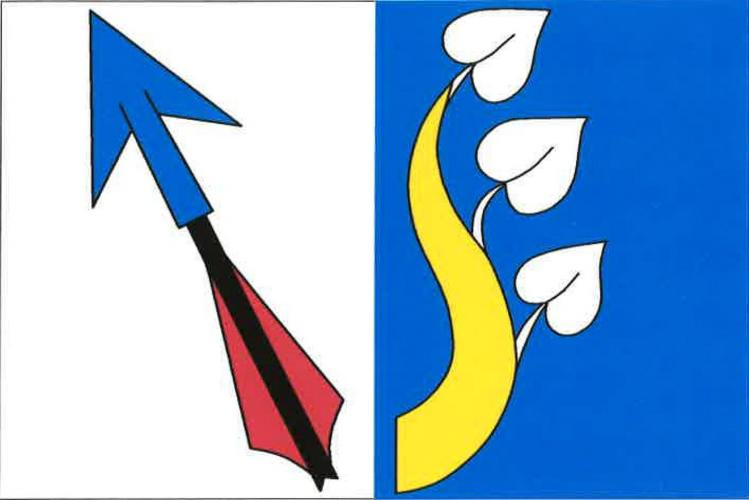
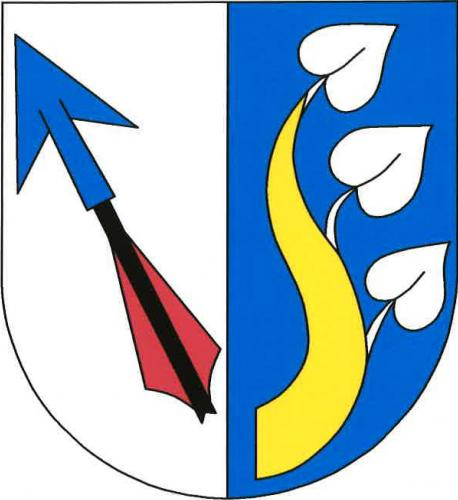
- Flag Coat of arms

- Location in the Czech Republic
- Coordinates: 49°12′3″N 14°4′29″E
- Country: Czech Republic
- Region: South Bohemian
- District: Strakonice
- First mentioned: 1240

Area
  - Total: 12.72 km^{2} (4.91 sq mi)
- Elevation: 468 m (1,535 ft)

Population (2026-01-01)
  - Total: 400
  - Density: 31/km^{2} (81/sq mi)
- Time zone: UTC+1 (CET)
  - Summer (DST): UTC+2 (CEST)
- Postal code: 389 01
- Website: www.drahonice.cz

Drahonice is a municipality and village in Strakonice District in the South Bohemian Region of the Czech Republic. It has about 400 inhabitants.

Drahonice lies approximately 15 kilometres (9 mi) south-east of Strakonice, 39 km (24 mi) north-west of České Budějovice, and 102 km (63 mi) south of Prague.

== Administrative division ==
Drahonice consists of two municipal parts (in brackets population according to the 2021 census):

- Drahonice (291)
- Albrechtice (98)

== Demographics ==
Historical population
| Year | Pop. | ±% |
|---|---|---|
| 1869 | 670 | — |
| 1880 | 663 | −1.0% |
| 1890 | 611 | −7.8% |
| 1900 | 631 | +3.3% |
| 1910 | 681 | +7.9% |
| 1921 | 675 | −0.9% |
| 1930 | 613 | −9.2% |
| 1950 | 485 | −20.9% |
| 1961 | 489 | +0.8% |
| 1970 | 428 | −12.5% |
| 1980 | 424 | −0.9% |
| 1991 | 365 | −13.9% |
| 2001 | 370 | +1.4% |
| 2011 | 348 | −5.9% |
| 2021 | 389 | +11.8% |
Source: Censuses
