= Rozsochy =

- Municipality
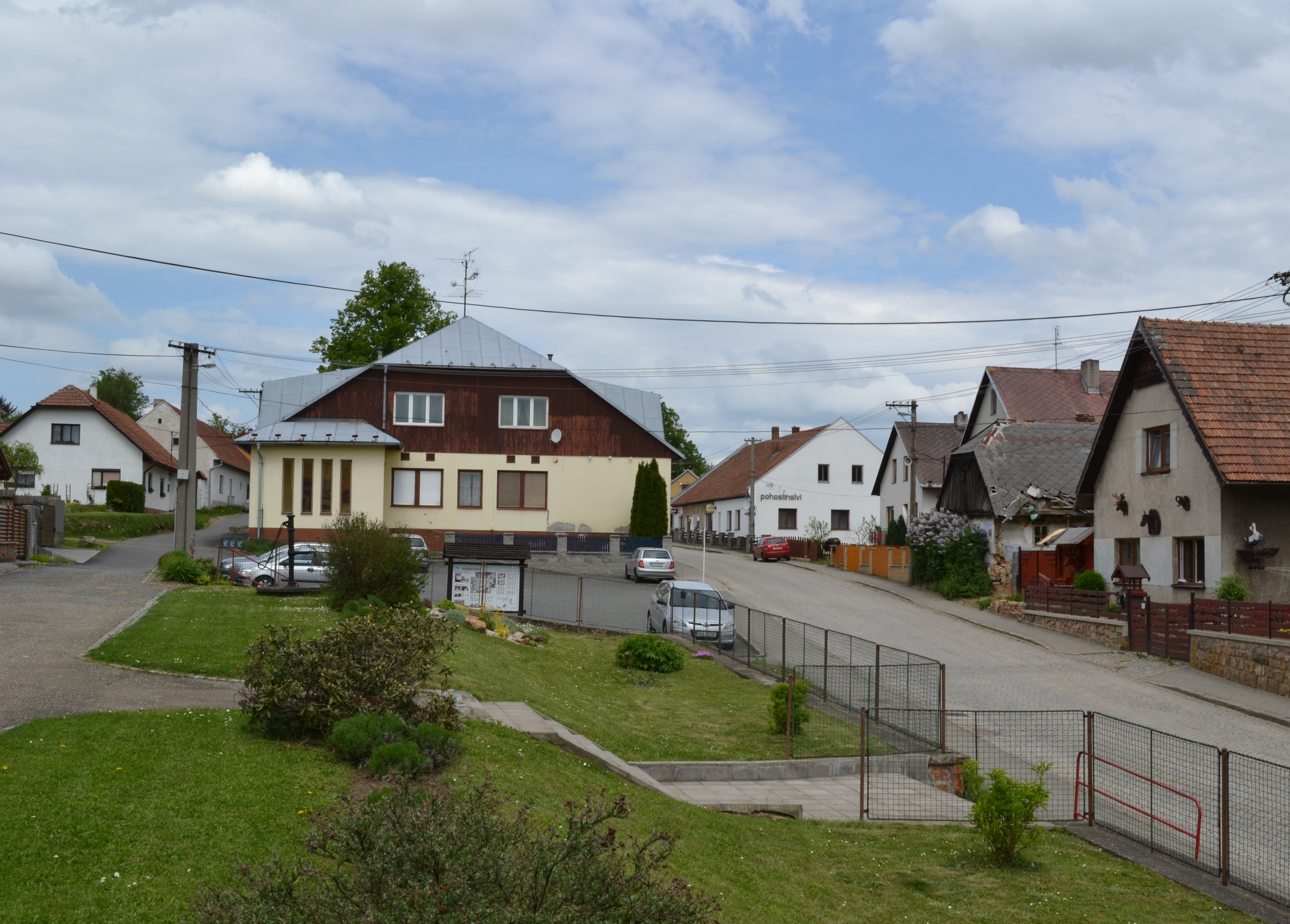
- Centre of Rozsochy

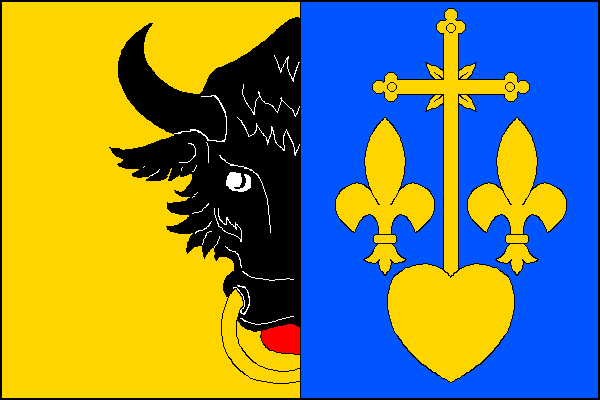
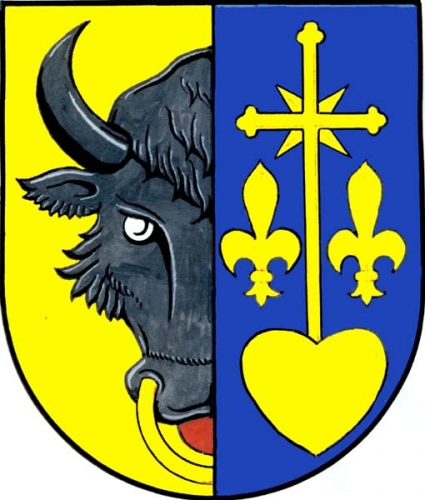
- Flag Coat of arms

- Location in the Czech Republic
- Coordinates: 49°31′13″N 16°12′0″E
- Country: Czech Republic
- Region: Vysočina
- District: Žďár nad Sázavou
- First mentioned: 1285

Area
  - Total: 15.65 km^{2} (6.04 sq mi)
- Elevation: 522 m (1,713 ft)

Population (2026-01-01)
  - Total: 673
  - Density: 43.0/km^{2} (111/sq mi)
- Time zone: UTC+1 (CET)
  - Summer (DST): UTC+2 (CEST)
- Postal code: 592 57
- Website: www.rozsochy.cz

Rozsochy is a municipality and village in Žďár nad Sázavou District in the Vysočina Region of the Czech Republic. It has about 700 inhabitants.

Rozsochy lies approximately 20 kilometres (12 mi) east of Žďár nad Sázavou, 47 kilometres (29 mi) east of Jihlava, and 143 kilometres (89 mi) south-east of Prague.

== Administrative division ==
Rozsochy consists of five municipal parts (in brackets population according to the 2021 census):

- Rozsochy (430)
- Albrechtice (80)
- Blažejovice (40)
- Kundratice (81)
- Vojetín (20)

== Demographics ==
Historical population
Year	Pop.	±%
1869	1,279	—
1880	1,230	−3.8%
1890	1,195	−2.8%
1900	1,211	+1.3%
1910	1,159	−4.3%
1921	1,160	+0.1%
1930	1,121	−3.4%
1950	834	−25.6%
1961	845	+1.3%
1970	783	−7.3%
1980	784	+0.1%
1991	731	−6.8%
2001	698	−4.5%
2011	684	−2.0%
2021	651	−4.8%
Source: Censuses
