= Nemile =

- Municipality
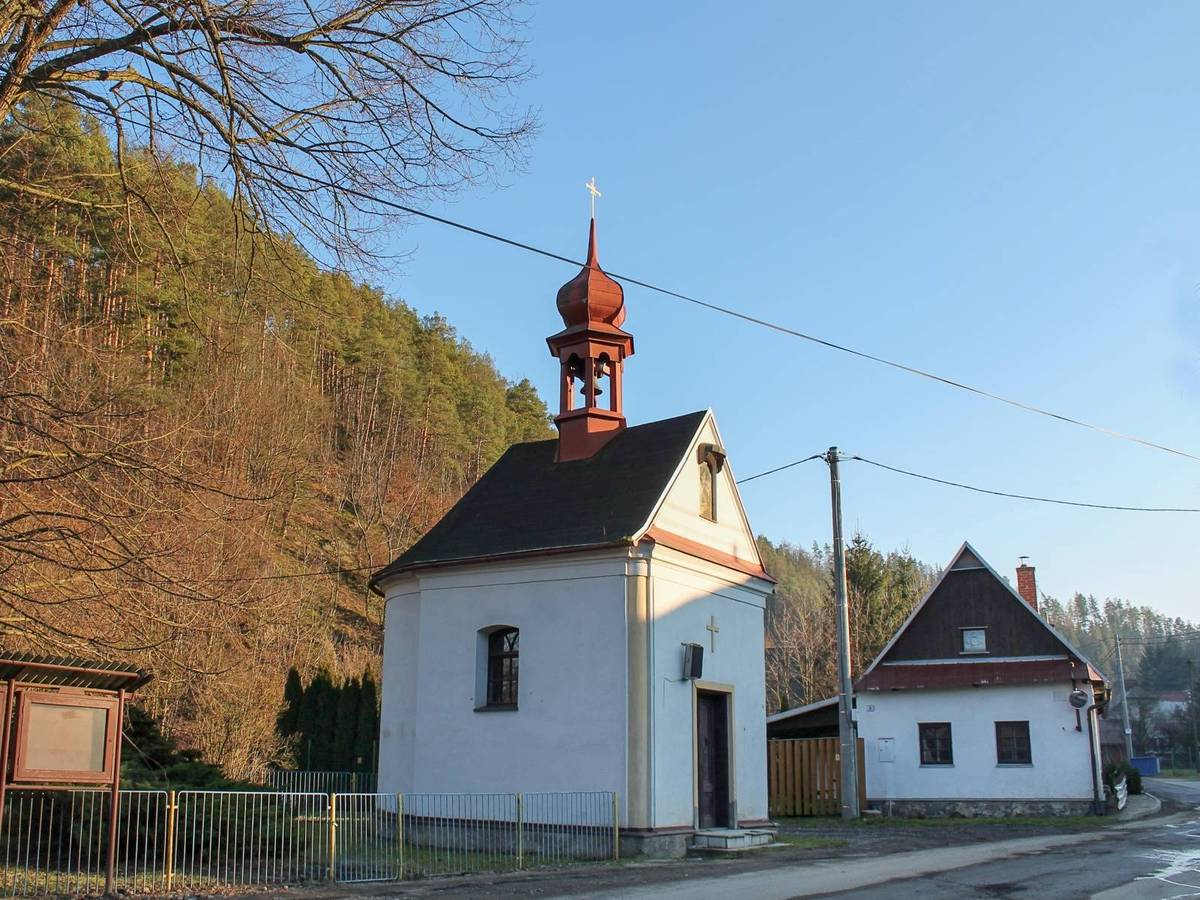
- Chapel of Saint Martin in Lupěné

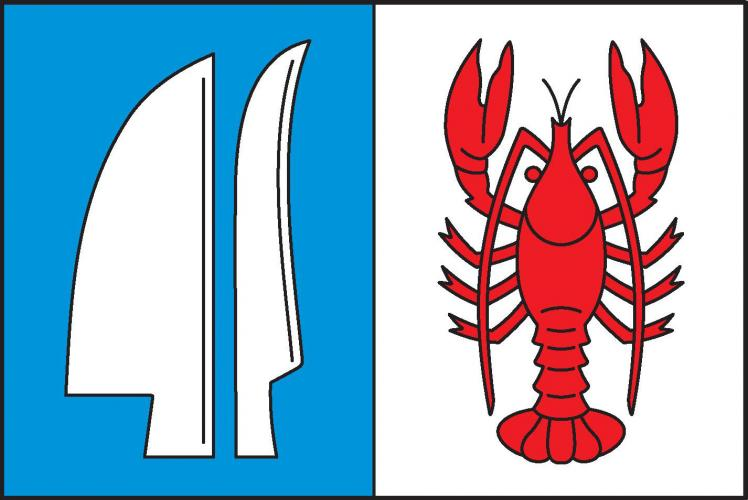
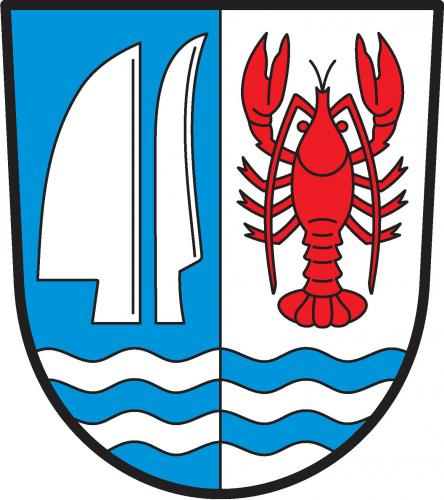
- Flag Coat of arms

- Location in the Czech Republic
- Coordinates: 49°52′29″N 16°50′51″E
- Country: Czech Republic
- Region: Olomouc
- District: Šumperk
- First mentioned: 1374

Area
  - Total: 5.53 km^{2} (2.14 sq mi)
- Elevation: 293 m (961 ft)

Population (2026-01-01)
  - Total: 681
  - Density: 123/km^{2} (319/sq mi)
- Time zone: UTC+1 (CET)
  - Summer (DST): UTC+2 (CEST)
- Postal codes: 789 01
- Website: www.obecnemile.cz

Nemile (German: Neumühle) is a municipality and village in Šumperk District in the Olomouc Region of the Czech Republic. It has about 700 inhabitants.

Nemile lies approximately 14 kilometres (9 mi) south-west of Šumperk, 43 km (27 mi) north-west of Olomouc, and 175 km (109 mi) east of Prague.

== Administrative division ==
Nemile consists of two municipal parts (in brackets population according to the 2021 census):

- Nemile (526)
- Lupěné (128)

== Demographics ==
Historical population
Year	Pop.	±%
1869	596	—
1880	642	+7.7%
1890	680	+5.9%
1900	690	+1.5%
1910	735	+6.5%
1921	702	−4.5%
1930	782	+11.4%
1950	645	−17.5%
1961	667	+3.4%
1970	606	−9.1%
1980	544	−10.2%
1991	516	−5.1%
2001	577	+11.8%
2011	634	+9.9%
2021	654	+3.2%
Source: Censuses
