= Albrechtice (Ústí nad Orlicí District) =

Municipality in the Czech Republic

- Municipality
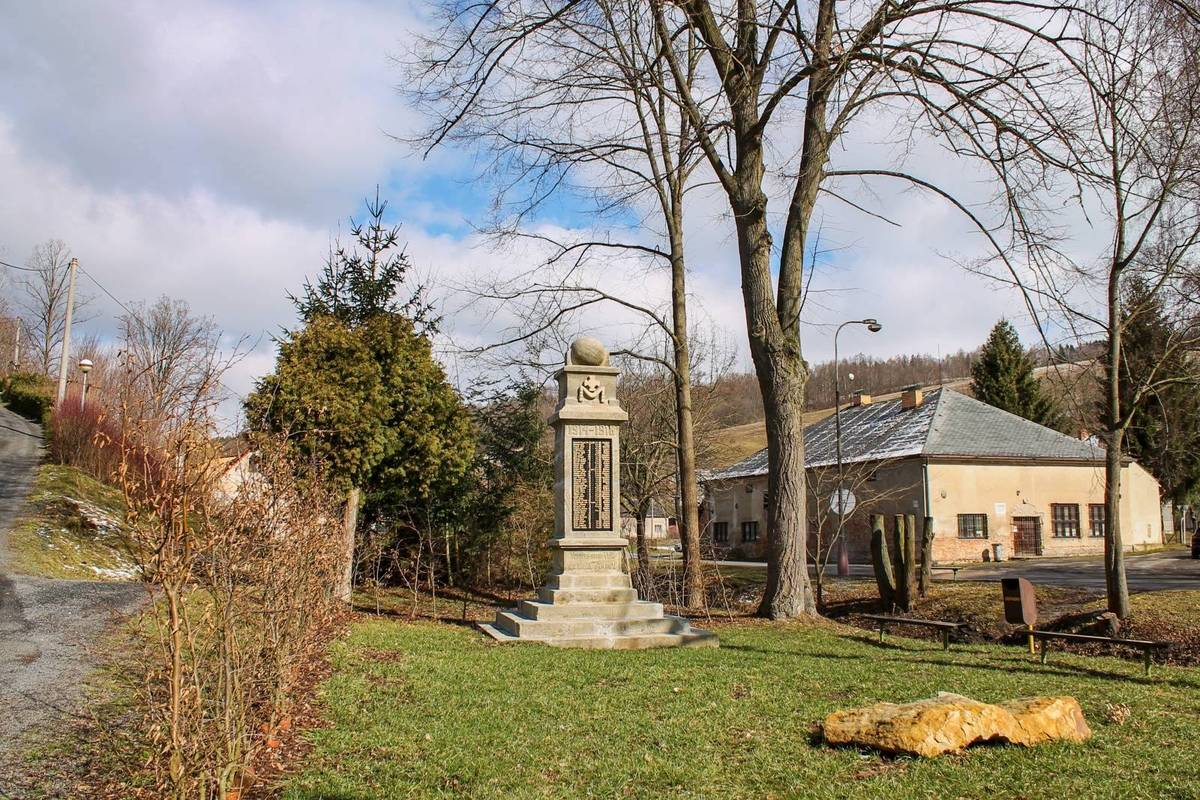
- Memorial to the Fallen

- Flag Coat of arms

- Location in the Czech Republic
- Coordinates: 49°55′39″N 16°38′41″E
- Country: Czech Republic
- Region: Pardubice
- District: Ústí nad Orlicí
- First mentioned: 1304

Area
  - Total: 10.07 km^{2} (3.89 sq mi)
- Elevation: 395 m (1,296 ft)

Population (2026-01-01)
  - Total: 448
  - Density: 44.5/km^{2} (115/sq mi)
- Time zone: UTC+1 (CET)
  - Summer (DST): UTC+2 (CEST)
- Postal code: 563 01
- Website: www.ou-albrechtice.cz

Albrechtice (German: Olbersdorf) is a municipality and village in Ústí nad Orlicí District in the Pardubice Region of the Czech Republic. It has about 400 inhabitants.

== Etymology ==
The name is derived from the personal name Albrecht, meaning "the village of Albrecht's people".

== Geography ==
Albrechtice is located about 18 kilometres (11 mi) east of Ústí nad Orlicí and 62 km (39 mi) east of Pardubice. It lies mostly in the Zábřeh Highlands, only the southwestern part of the municipal territory extends into the Svitavy Uplands. The highest point is at 615 m (2,018 ft) above sea level. The village is situated in the valley of the Moravská Sázava River.

== History ==
The first written mention of Albrechtice is from 1304, when King Wenceslaus II donated the village to the Zbraslav Monastery, which annexed it to the Lanškroun estate. In 1356, the estate with Albrechtice was acquired by the Litomyšl bishopric. After the Hussite Wars, the estate became property of the Kostka of Postupice family, who sold it to the Pernštejn family. In 1588, it was bought by Adam Hrzán of Harasov. From 1622 until the establishment of an independent municipality in 1850, Albrechtice was owned by the Liechtenstein family.

== Demographics ==
Historical population

Year	Pop.	±%
1869	780	—
1880	868	+11.3%
1890	926	+6.7%
1900	816	−11.9%
1910	825	+1.1%

Year	Pop.	±%
1921	768	−6.9%
1930	700	−8.9%
1950	439	−37.3%
1961	517	+17.8%
1970	498	−3.7%

Year	Pop.	±%
1980	507	+1.8%
1991	486	−4.1%
2001	495	+1.9%
2011	469	−5.3%
2021	452	−3.6%

Source: Censuses

== Transport ==
The I/43 road from Brno and Svitavy to the Czech–Polish border in Králíky runs through the municipality.

== Sights ==
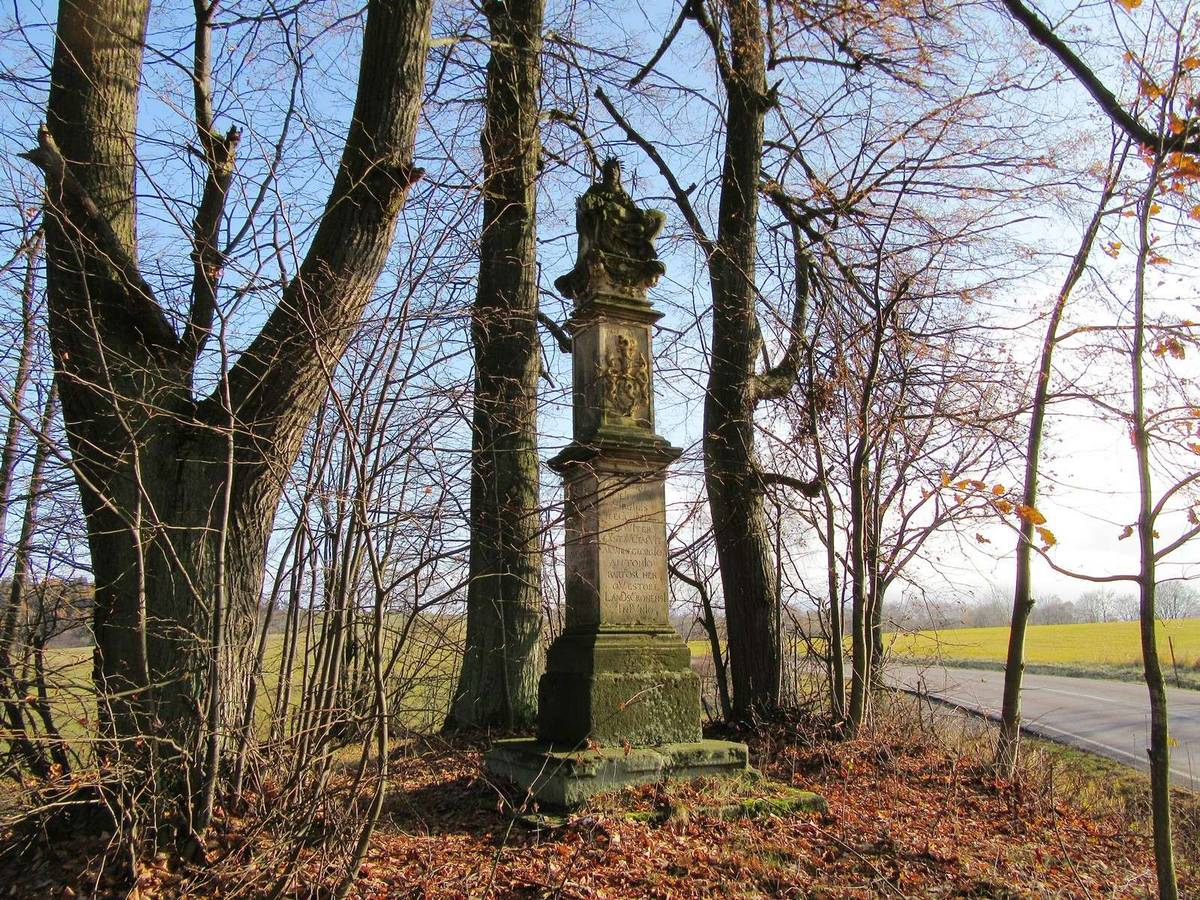
Baroque column

The only protected cultural monument in the municipality is a Baroque column with a sculpture of Pietà. The column dates from 1704, but the sculpture is probably up to 50 years younger.

The main landmark of Albrechtice is the Chapel of Saint Anne.
