= Sázava (Ústí nad Orlicí District) =

- Municipality
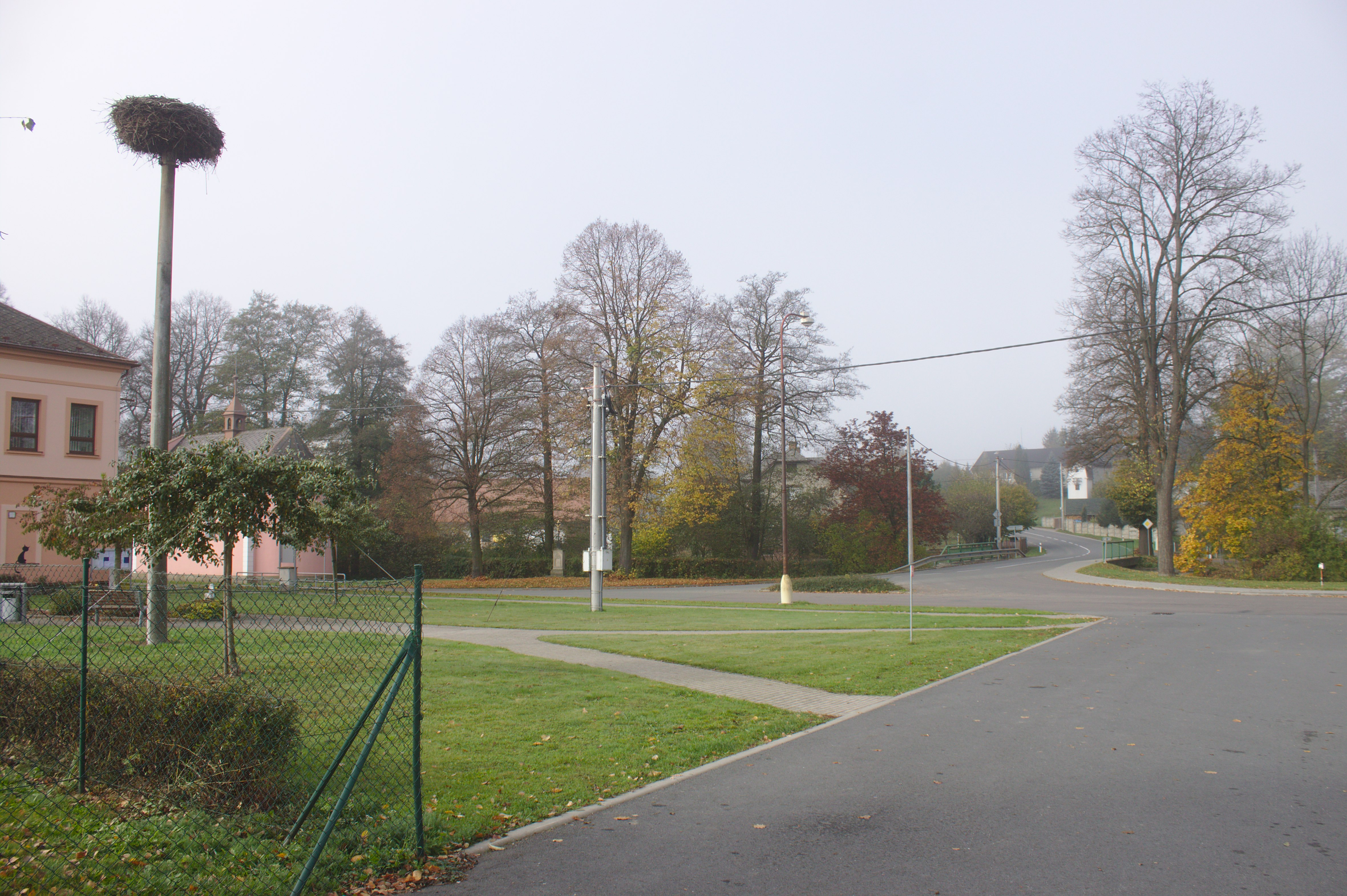
- Centre of Sázava

- Flag Coat of arms

- Location in the Czech Republic
- Coordinates: 49°54′29″N 16°38′27″E
- Country: Czech Republic
- Region: Pardubice
- District: Ústí nad Orlicí
- First mentioned: 1304

Area
  - Total: 5.68 km^{2} (2.19 sq mi)
- Elevation: 365 m (1,198 ft)

Population (2026-01-01)
  - Total: 553
  - Density: 97.4/km^{2} (252/sq mi)
- Time zone: UTC+1 (CET)
  - Summer (DST): UTC+2 (CEST)
- Postal code: 563 01
- Website: www.obec-sazava.cz

Sázava (German: Zohsee) is a municipality and village in Ústí nad Orlicí District in the Pardubice Region of the Czech Republic. It has about 600 inhabitants.

== Etymology ==
The name Sázava was derived from the Moravská Sázava River. In the oldest documents, the name is written as Nasazawe (lit. 'at Sázava').

== Geography ==
Sázava is located about 19 kilometres (12 mi) northeast of Ústí nad Orlicí and 62 km (39 mi) east of Pardubice. It lies mostly in the Orlické Foothills. The eastern part of the municipal territory extends into the Zábřeh Highlands and includes the highest point of Sázava at 518 m (1,699 ft) above sea level. The village is situated in the valley of the Moravská Sázava River.

== History ==
The locality was first documented in 1256. The first written mention of the village of Sázava is in a deed of King Wenceslaus II from 1304, when the village was donated to the Zbraslav Monastery as part of the Lanškroun estate. Until the establishment of an independent municipality in 1850, Sázava belonged to the Lanškroun estate and shared its owners and destinies.

== Demographics ==
Historical population

Year	Pop.	±%
1869	595	—
1880	672	+12.9%
1890	661	−1.6%
1900	588	−11.0%
1910	545	−7.3%

Year	Pop.	±%
1921	597	+9.5%
1930	489	−18.1%
1950	369	−24.5%
1961	414	+12.2%
1970	403	−2.7%

Year	Pop.	±%
1980	520	+29.0%
1991	529	+1.7%
2001	554	+4.7%
2011	566	+2.2%
2021	259	−54.2%

Source: Censuses

== Transport ==
There are no railways or major roads passing through the municipality.

== Sights ==
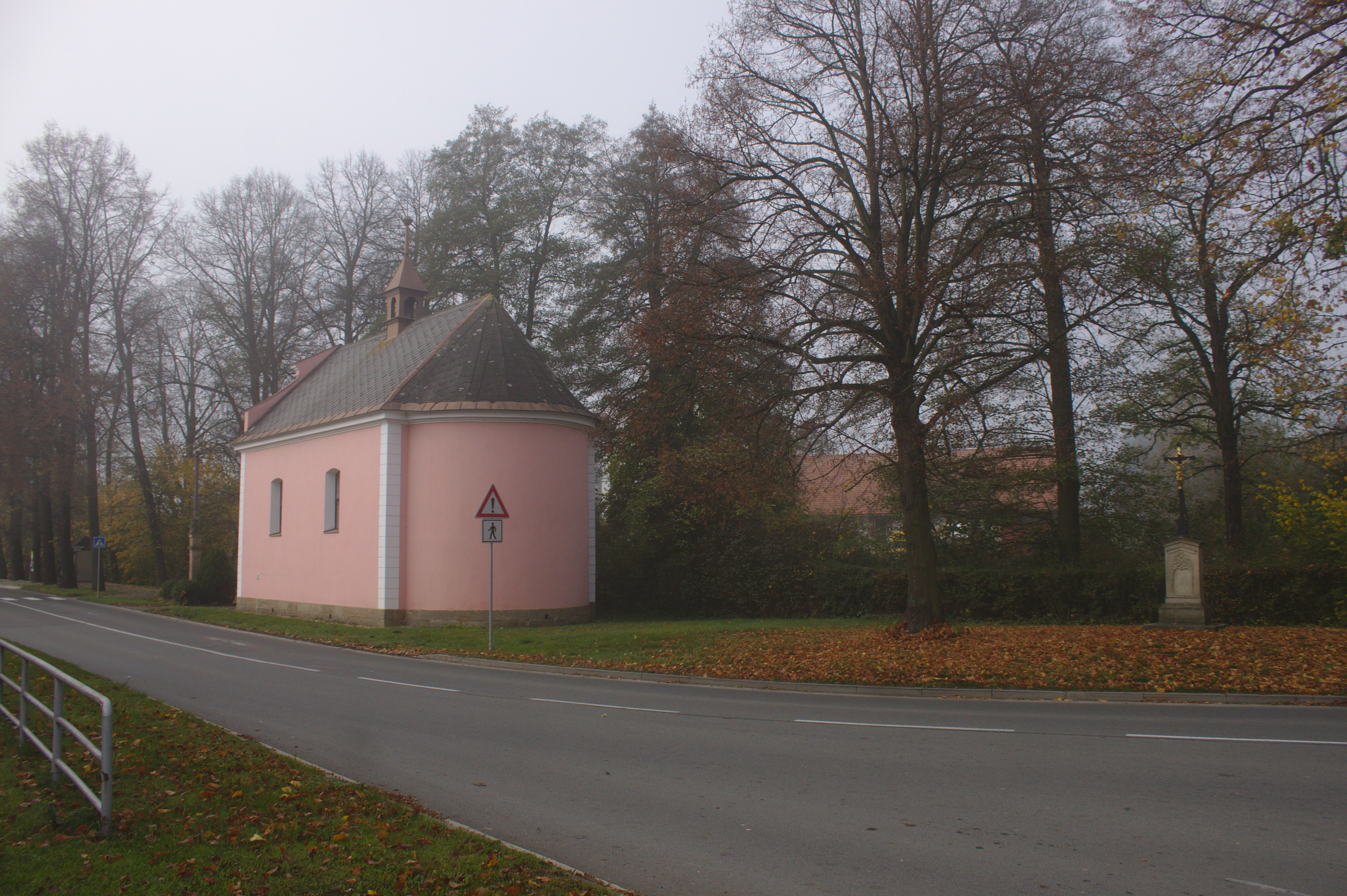
Chapel of Saint Procopius

The only protected cultural monument in the municipality is column with a Baroque statue of the Pietà. The column was created in 1681, but the statue dates probably from 1751. The statue stands next to the Chapel of Saint Procopius, which is the main cultural landmark of Sázava. It was built in 1858.
