= Deepenhorngraben =

Small river in Hamburg, Germany

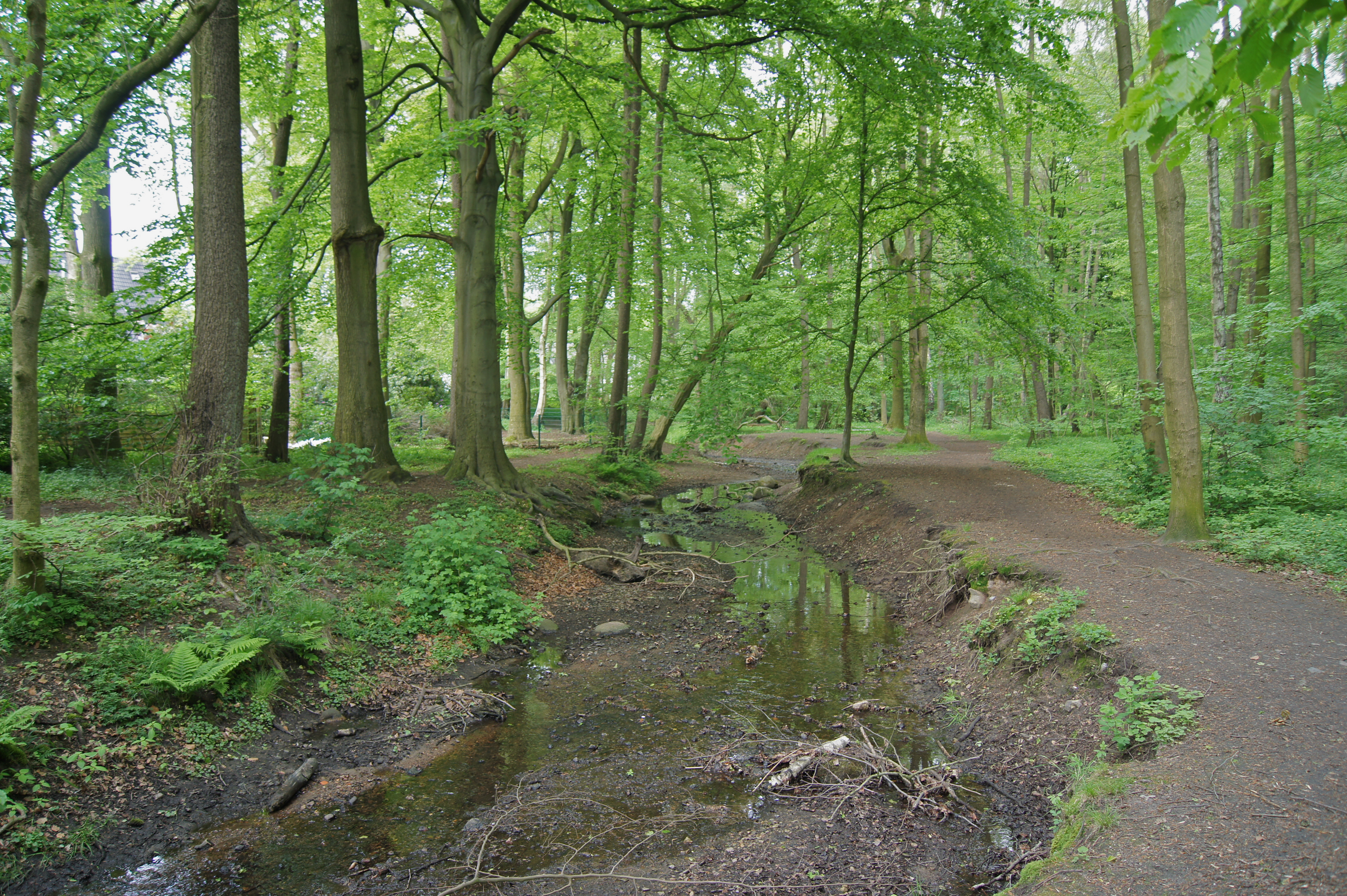
- The river in Berne

Location
- Country: Germany
- State: Hamburg

Physical characteristics
- Mouth
  - location: Berner Au
  - coordinates: 53.6242°N 10.1251°E

Basin features
- Progression: Berner Au→ Wandse→ Alster→ Elbe→ North Sea

Deepenhorngraben is a small river of Hamburg, Germany. It flows into the Berner Au near Farmsen-Berne.

== See also ==
- List of rivers of Hamburg
