= Rahlstedt =

- Quarter of Hamburg
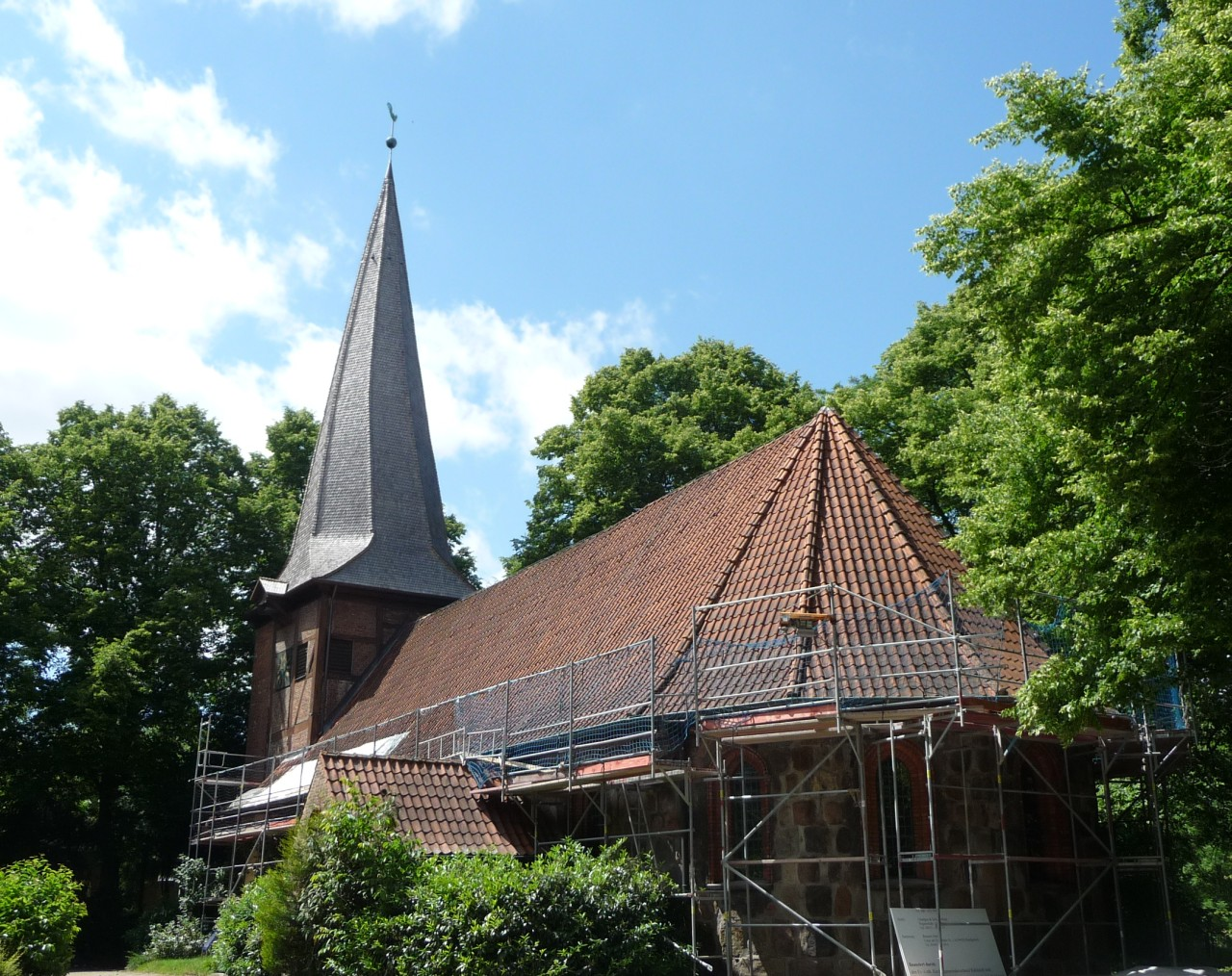
- Alt-Rahlstedter church

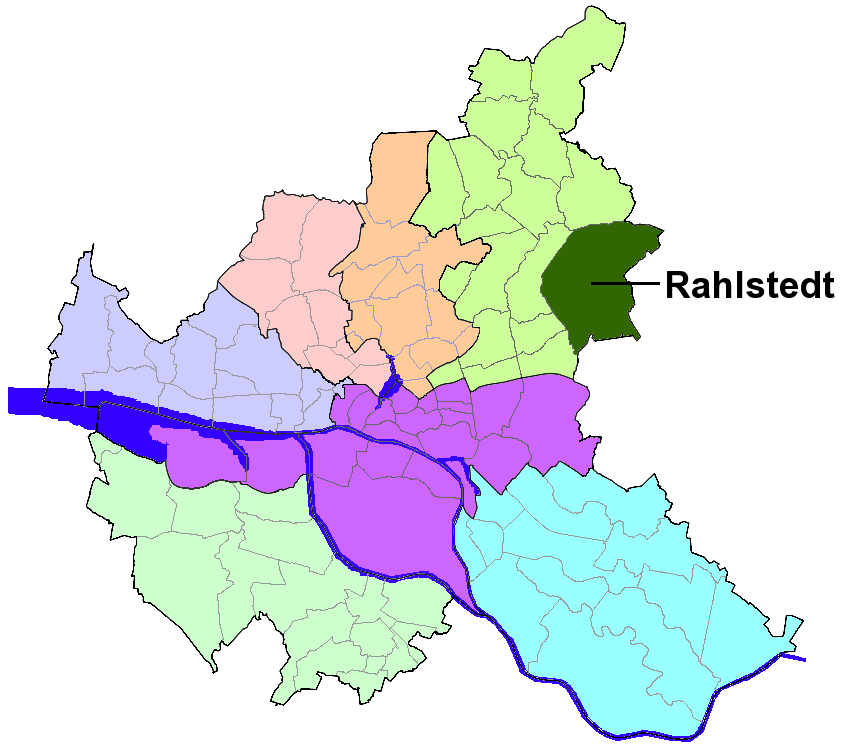
- Location of Rahlstedt in the city of Hamburg
- Interactive map of Rahlstedt
- Location within Germany Location within Hamburg
- Coordinates: 53°36′00″N 10°09′00″E
- Country: Germany
- State: Hamburg
- City: Hamburg
- Borough: Wandsbek

Area
  - Total: 26.6 km^{2} (10.3 sq mi)

Population (2024-12-31)
  - Total: 95,836
  - Density: 3,600/km^{2} (9,330/sq mi)
- Time zone: UTC+01:00 (CET)
  - Summer (DST): UTC+02:00 (CEST)
- Dialling codes: 040
- Vehicle registration: HH

Rahlstedt (German pronunciation: [ˈʁaːlʃtɛt]) is a quarter (Stadtteil) in the Wandsbek borough (Bezirk) of the Free and Hanseatic city of Hamburg in northern Germany. In 2023, the population was 95,743.

== History ==
The quarter was first mentioned in 1248 with the name of "Radoluestede".The name refers to a foundation as a Saxon settlement by a man named Radolf, the suffix -stede denotes a location on safe ground.

Rahlstedt was located on the eastern edge of the city of Hamburg, belonged to the Duchy of Holstein under the Danish crown and fell with it to Prussia in 1864. In 1927, the villages of Altrahlstedt, Neurahlstedt, Meiendorf and Oldenfelde as well as parts of Tonndorf-Lohe and Jenfeld were merged to form the Prussian municipality of Rahlstedt and became part of Hamburg under the Greater Hamburg Act of 1937.

== Geography ==
The quarter, situated in the north-eastern side of Hamburg, is the largest of its boroughs and one of the most extensive in the city. It borders Hamburg's quarters of Volksdorf, Farmsen-Berne, Tonndorf and Jenfeld; and with the district of Stormarn, in Schleswig-Holstein.

The stream Wandse, originating near the municipality Siek (district Stormarn), and its confluents Rahlau, Stellau and Stellmoorer Quellfluss, run through Rahlstedt. The Rahlau flows into the Wandse near Nordmarkstraße, whereas the Stellau does near Wilhelm-Grimm-Straße. The Stellmoorer Quellfluss within the Stellmoorer Tunneltal.

The most significant features, remains from the ice age, are located within the nature reserves Stellmoorer Tunneltal and Höltigbaum.

The Rahlstedt Cemetery contains 19,000 graves, including that of the 19th century poet Detlev von Liliencron.

== Demographics ==
In 2006 86,413 people lived in the Rahlstedt quarter. The population density was 3,252/km^{2} (8,423/sq mi). 17.4% were children under the age of 18, and 22.5% were 65 years of age or older. Resident aliens were 9% of the population. 3,983 people were registered as unemployed.

In 1999 there were 41,301 households, out of which 22.4% had children under the age of 18 living with them and 38.8% of all households were made up of individuals. The average household size was 2.05.

== Education ==
Among the schools in Rahlstedt are Gymnasium Oldenfelde, Gymnasium Rahlstedt, Gymnasium Meiendorf, and Neue Schule Hamburg.

== Places Of Interest ==
- The Old Rahlstedt Church, built in its oldest parts of fieldstones from the 13th century.
- Many central parts of Rahlstedt are characterized by Art Nouveau and Wilhelminian style villas, which are often well preserved. Among architects, Rahlstedt is known for its Art Nouveau ensembles. Many houses are therefore protected as historic monuments or ensembles, e.g. Remstedtstraße.
- Rahlstedt has a modern core with the pedestrian zones Schweriner Straße, Rahlstedter Bahnhofstraße and around the train station.
- Rahlstedt is home to Liliencronstraße and the small Liliencronpark including a monument - both are dedicated to the poet Detlev von Liliencron.
- Near the former local office is also the public library, also named after von Liliencron.

== Notes ==
=== References ===
- Selectable database: Statistical office Hamburg and Schleswig-Holstein Statistisches Amt für Hamburg und Schleswig-Holstein. (in German)
