= Rodenbek (river) =

River in Germany

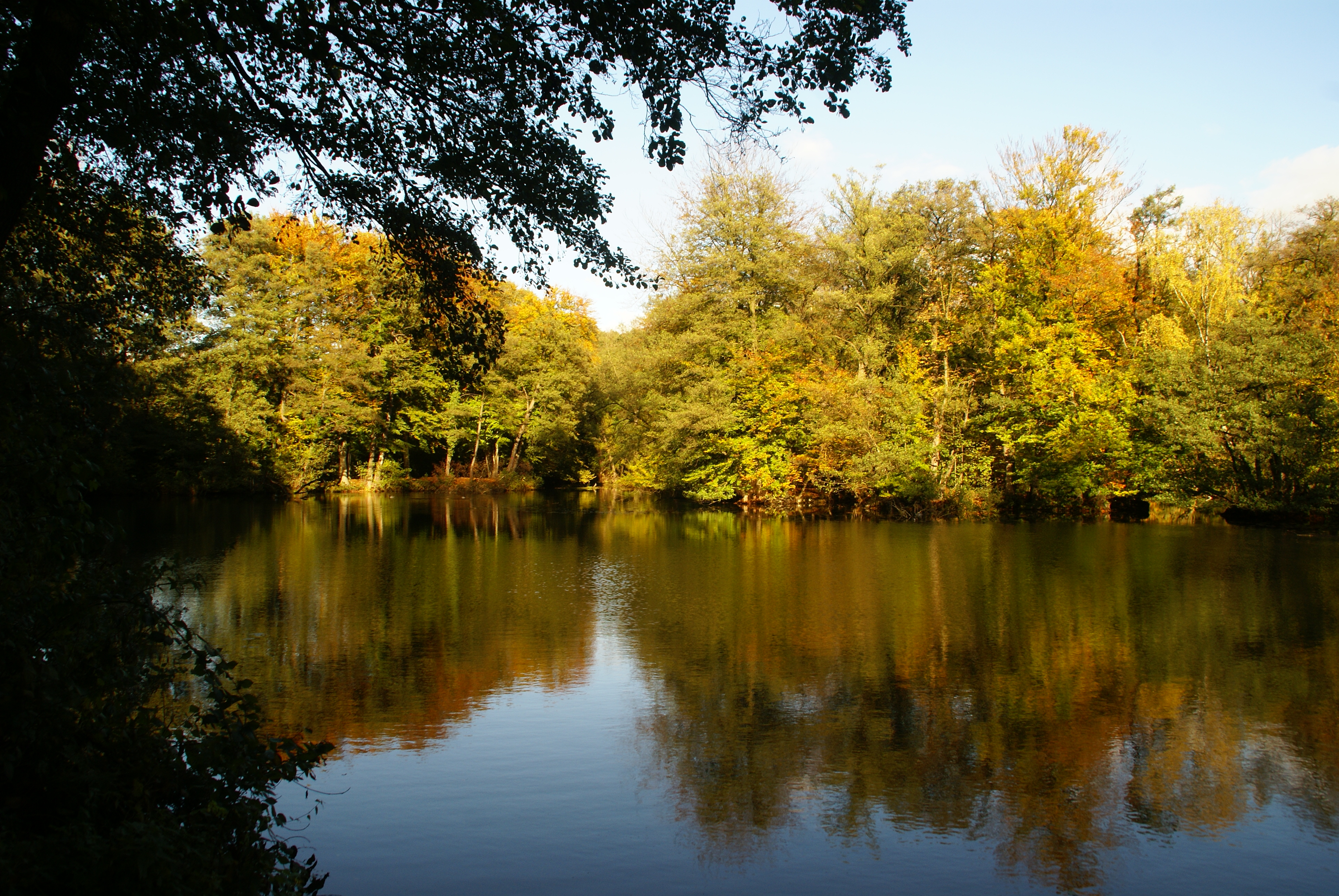
- The Rodenbeker Teich (Rodenbek Pond) on the river in October

Location
- Country: Germany

Physical characteristics
- Source
  - location: Confluence of two ditches near the Rudolf-Steiner and Christophorus schools
  - coordinates: 53°40′35″N 10°08′05″E
- Mouth
  - location: The nature reserve of Rodenbeker Quellental
  - coordinates: 53°41′04″N 10°06′58″E

Basin features
- Progression: Alster→ Elbe→ North Sea
- Waterbodies: Rodenbeker Teich

The Rodenbek is a right-hand, northern tributary of the River Alster in North Germany and, together with the Bredenbek and Lottbek, as well as other small streams, is part of the meltwater basin of the Rodenbek Glacial Valley (Rodenbeker Quellental) that was formed in the Weichselian Ice Age.

Like the other rivers in the glacial valley, the Rodenbek flows in an east–west direction to the Alster, a tributary of the Elbe.

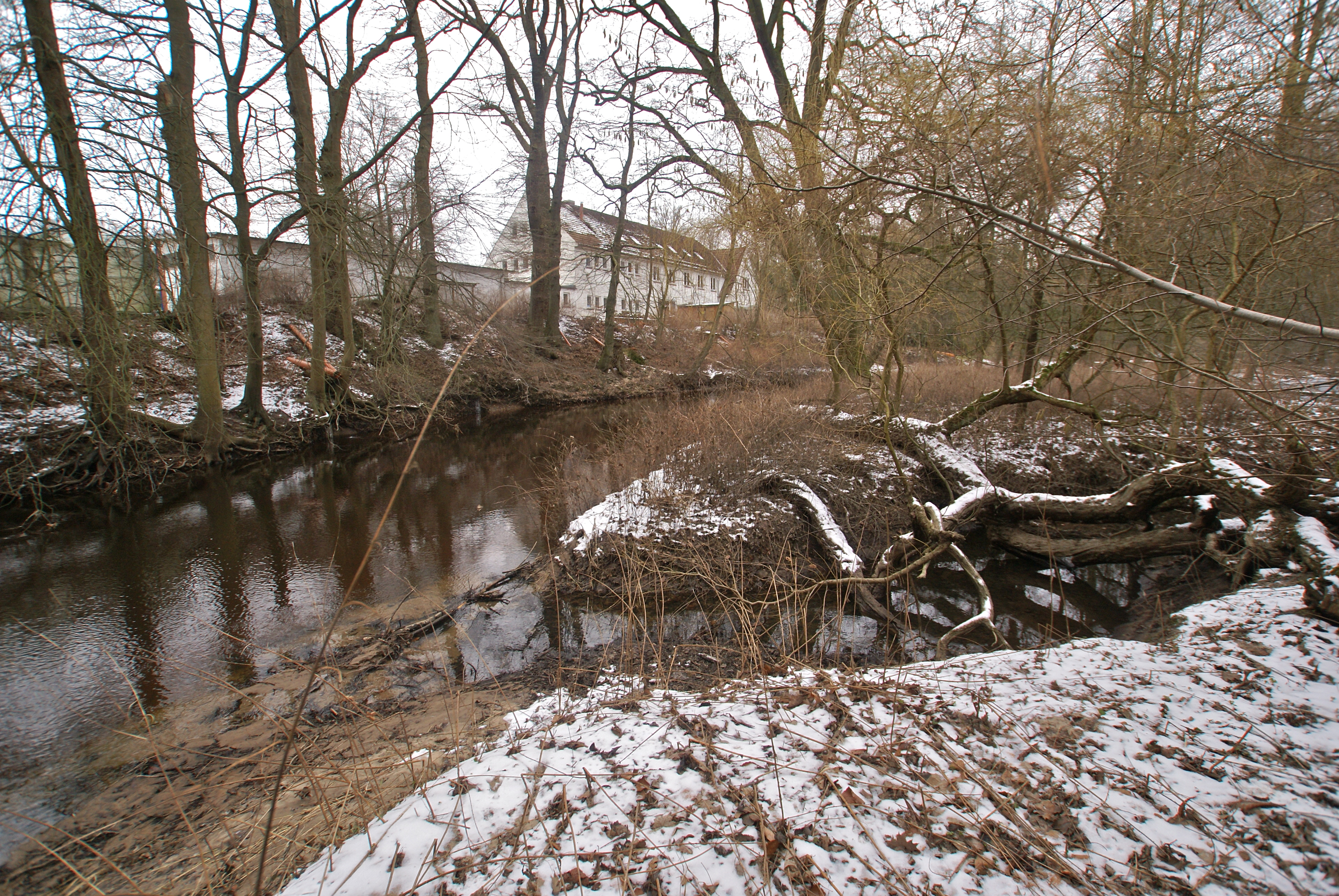
The confluence of the Rodenbek and the Alster

As well as being home to fish that occur in the Alster, burbot, sunbleak, common dace and stickleback have also been observed in the Rodenbek. The ponds of the Rodenbeker Teiche, 2.8 hectares in area, with their water lilies are looked after by members of an angling club in Rahlstedt (Sportfischerverein Rahlstedt von 1934 e.V.) and stocked with carp, tench, pike, perch and eel.

== See also ==
- List of rivers of Hamburg
