= Rodenbek =

Rodenbek may refer to:

- Rodenbek (municipality), in Schleswig-Holstein, Germany
- Rodenbek (river), in North Germany, tributary of the Alster
- SS Rodenbek, a cargo ship built 1944 in Germany
