= Siegfried Rautenberg =

German murderer and suspected serial killer

- Photograph published by the press
- Born: Siegfried Walter Rautenberg; 1942; Hamburg, Germany
- Disappeared: 27 November 1968
- Status: Missing, presumed dead

Details
- Victims: 1–3
- Span of crimes: May – October 1968
- Country: West Germany
- State: Hamburg

Siegfried Walter Rautenberg (1942 – 18 August 1975?) was a German waiter and suspected serial killer who was indicted for the murder of Monika Schwiegerhausen, a 22-year-old prostitute who worked in a red-light district in Hamburg, who was found drowned on 10 October 1968. In addition to this, he was also considered the prime suspect in the killings of two others committed months earlier. Rautenberg fled the country before he could be arrested and was later said to have died while serving in the Spanish Legion, but as his body was never recovered, this cannot be confirmed with certainty.

== Murders, investigation and indictment ==
On 23 May 1968, the body of 35-year-old prostitute Ursula Beier was found in a well near Schenefeld by a father and daughter who were walking by. Beier, a mother of three from Chemnitz who had been prostituting herself around St. Pauli, was stabbed repeatedly and had her throat cut by the killer. Four days after her murder, a dock worker named Bernhard M. was arrested and charged with her murder, as during the investigation, police had learned that Beier had met a client by the name of "Berni". He was interrogated at the local police station, but as there was no further mention of him in the newspapers, he was presumably cleared of suspicion and released.

On 4 June, a passer-by found the body of a young woman in Eidelstedt, showing signs of sexual abuse and strangulation marks around her neck. A police sketch was released of the unknown decedent, allowing a local housewife to positively identify her as her daughter, 22-year-old Helga Apitz. At the time of her death, Apitz, the mother of a 2-year-old child who lived with relatives, was living at a women's shelter in Winterhude and was known for prostituting herself in St. Pauli and for being reported missing on six previous occasions. According to witnesses, she was last seen entering a gray Volkswagen Transporter driven by a young man wearing a brown hat and a bluish summer coat, which had Hamburg license plates. Around the time of her identification, links were already made with the Beier homicide due to their similarities, with authorities attempting to track down the killer via paper bags which had been left behind at the crime scene. A task force mobilized by Police Commissioner Hans Lühr led to the inspection of thousands of Volkswagen Transporters matching the description given by witnesses, but no results came out of it.

The last murder occurred on 10 October, when the naked body of 22-year-old prostitute Monika Schwiegerhausen was found floating in the Pepermölenbek river near Wedel, by a group of children who were playing next to the riverbank. While her cause of death was designated as drowning, the manner in which she had died suggested to the investigators that she had been killed, with a high possibility that Schwiegerhausen being sedated with an anaesthetic, undressed, robbed and then thrown into the river by the assailant.

== Identification, search and presumed death ==
In early November, authorities discovered an abandoned Mercedes near Lake Constance, and upon inspecting it, they discovered a myriad of stolen goods, including jewellery, clothing and handbags. Among these items were a pair of purple suede boots, which one witness claimed were worn by Schwiegerhausen on the day of her disappearance. Suspecting that this might be the killer's vehicle, the police checked the registration number and discovered that the Mercedes had been rented on 4 October in Sasel by a man named Siegfried Rautenberg. Rautenberg, a 26-year-old waiter who lived in Bergstedt with his wife and two children, had reportedly approached the car dealership claiming that he needed the vehicle for "business trips" and was last seen on October 9, the day before Schwiegerhausen disappeared. Due to the strong circumstantial evidence pointing towards his guilt, a red notice was issued by Interpol for his arrest in her murder. In addition to this, authorities from Hamburg also wanted him for questioning in the murders of Beier and Apitz, due to their proximity and similarities to one another.

However, Rautenberg fled the country and joined the Spanish Legion, which refused to extradite him to Germany as long as he served in their ranks. He was then dispatched to Fort Semara in Smara, Spanish Sahara, from where it was reported that he attempted to escape on 18 August 1975. However, his attempt supposedly failed, as the reports claimed that he died from dehydration in the desert. As no body was ever recovered, this claim remains unverified.

== See also ==
- List of fugitives from justice who disappeared
