= Oscar Fetrás =

German composer (1854–1931)

- Born: Otto Kaufmann Faster; 16 February 1854
- Died: 10 January 1931 (aged 76)
- Genre: Classical
- Occupations: Composer, musician
- Instrument: Piano

Oscar Fetrás (16 February 1854 – 10 January 1931) was a German composer of popular dance music, military marches, piano pieces and arrangements.

Fetrás had over 200 compositions to his name. His best known work is his waltz "Mondnacht auf der Alster" Op. 60 which is still immensely popular to the present day.

== Biography ==
Fetrás was born as Otto Kaufmann Faster in 1854 in Hamburg. His father Matthias Faster was an Hamburgian editor of a stock-exchange magazine. The Faster family originally came from Bützfleth, a locality of today's Stade near Hamburg. Fetrás's grandfather, a sea captain, died in the sinking of his ship Ceres. His mother Amalie Margarethe, born Decker, had ancestral origins from the island of Sylt.

Early in his career Fetrás worked for Ferdinand Laeisz, founder of the Flying P-Liner. Once he became widely regarded as being on the same level as the revered Viennese waltz kings, he departed to conduct his own orchestra. At the age of 26 Fetrás's compositions attracted the attention of a Hamburg publisher. He changed his name to Fetrás, an anagram of his surname Faster.

Fetrás soon rose to the position of conductor of the Uhlenhorster Fährhaus, a famous restaurant with ballrooms in Hamburg for which he composed his second most famous, but now forgotten work, Uhlenhorster Kinder. He was regarded as the most talented light music composer that Northern Germany ever produced and from the start modelled his own composing on that of his idol, Johann Strauss Jr. As a gift of thanks for his waltz "Mondnacht auf der Alster" which brought Hamburg international acclaim, the local business community gave Fetrás a bronze statue of the Roman god Hermes/Mercurius by the French artist Marius Montagne. This statue is the only remaining possession of Fetrás which survived the World War II bombings and is now owned privately in Henstedt-Ulzburg near Hamburg.

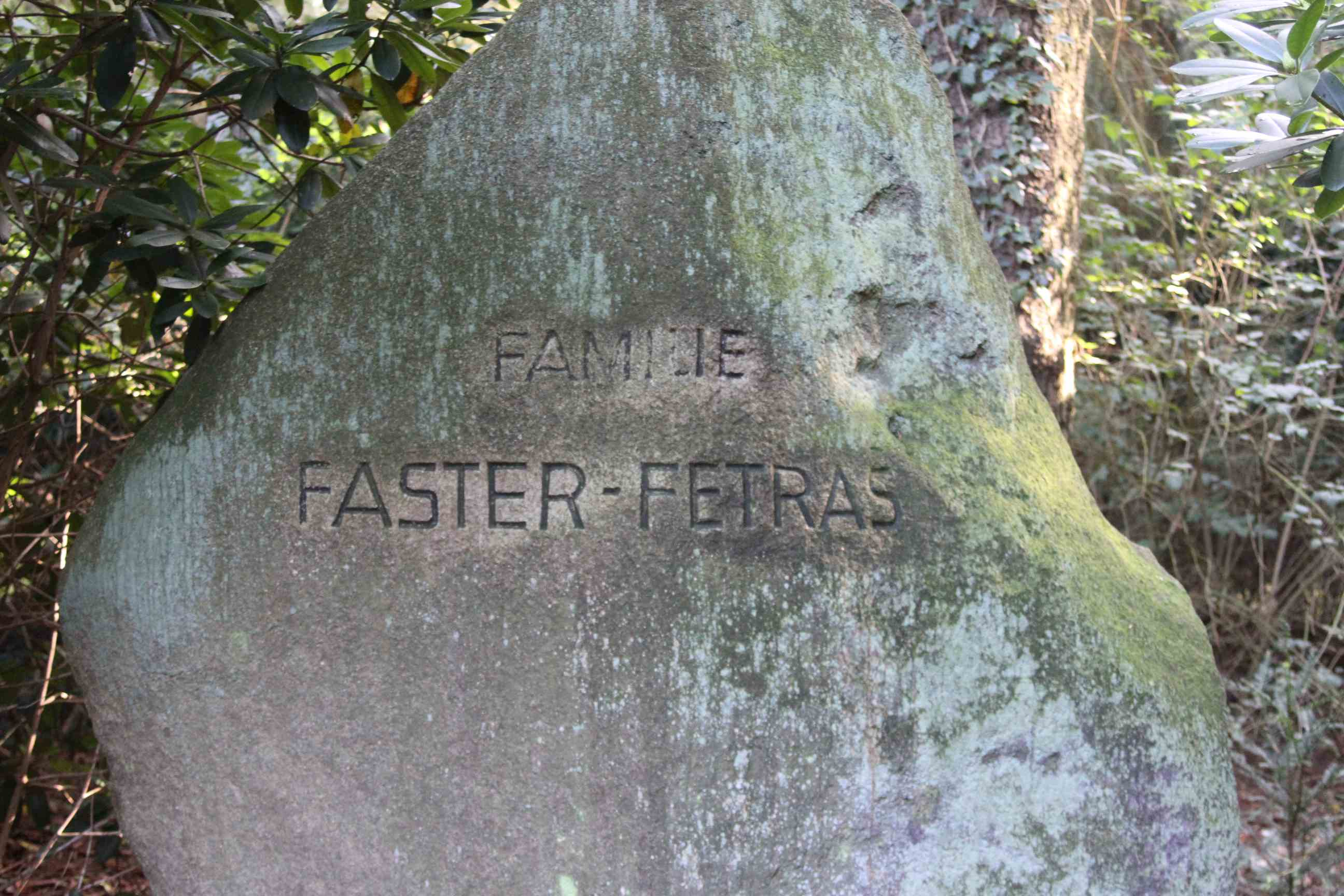
His tombstone

It might have been Franz von Blon, at that time the conductor of the Stadttheater Orchestra, who introduced "Mondnacht auf der Alster" at the inaugural concert for the 1888 ball season. It was a sensation and earned Fetrás the title of "The Hamburg Waltz King". Soon he was invited to tour Germany, Austria and France with his orchestra. He became personally acquainted with Johann Strauss. In 1904 he won a prize for his composition "Frühlingsluft" and later he wrote Reiche Mädchen, a reworking of Johann Strauss's 1897 operetta Die Göttin der Vernunft. The complete Die Göttin der Vernunft operetta has been released in 2011 by Naxos Records, whilst the Reiche Mädchen has been recorded by Marco Polo on their two CD production of Johann Strauss operetta collections. Fetrás remained well-known and respected and though definitely a second rank composer in the Viennese style, he produced some 300 works. Fetrás died January 1931 in Hamburg and was buried in the Ohlsdorf Cemetery.

== Legacy ==
In 1943, the Uhlenhorster Fährhaus was destroyed by Allied bombing, and with it was lost the original score of Fetrás's most famous work "Mondnacht auf der Alster". The waltzes and music of Fetrás appear to have disappeared from the mainstream repertoire since then. This was primarily due to the many outlets of music publishers and music parts libraries which issued his material being destroyed during the bombing of Hamburg in World War II, leaving no publishers to issue his material to this day. Arrangements for solo piano of all of his works, published with opus numbers, are available on IMSLP.

In Hamburg-Rahlstedt the street Fetrasweg is named after him.

== Works ==
- Op. 10 Goldschmieds Töchterlein – waltz
- Op. 11 Bankett – march
- Op. 12 Schönes Lenchen – polka française
- Op. 13 Hand in Hand – lanciers
- Op. 14 Lustig voran! – march
- Op. 15 in der gold'nen Faschingszeit – waltz
- Op. 16 Traulich beisammen – gavotte
- Op. 17 Fruhling im Herzen – waltz
- Op. 18 Ihm nach! – polka schnell
- Op. 19 Luftschlösser – waltz
- Op. 20 Flottes Carré – lanciers
- Op. 21 Rosamundchen – polka française
- Op. 22 Carmen – waltz after motives from Bizet's opera
- Op. 23 Nachtschwärmer – waltz
- Op. 24 An die Gewehre! – march
- Op. 25 Die Schäferin – rheinische polka
- Op. 26 Das blonde Gretchen – waltz
- Op. 27 Maskentrubel – polka française
- Op. 28 Elekrisch – polka schnell
- Op. 29 Balduin Dahl-march – march
- Op. 30 La mascotte – waltz after motives from Audran's opera
- Op. 31 Im Morgengrauen – waltz
- Op. 32 Le Petit blue – march
- Op. 33 Vis a Vis – lanciers
- Op. 34 Rip-Rip Valse – waltz after motives from Robert Planquette
- Op. 35 Spanischer – waltz
- Op. 36 Blumenpyramiden – waltz
- Op. 37 Wintergarten – quadrille
- Op. 38 Zigeunerblut – march
- Op. 39 Kostümfest – quadrille
- Op. 40 Uhlenhorster Kinder – waltz
- Op. 41 Nur fest! – march
- Op. 42 Irma – waltz after motives from Audran's opera
- Op. 43 Fensterpromenaden – waltz
- Op. 44 Dunkle Rose – polka-mazurka
- Op. 45 Dir zu Lieb! – polka française
- Op. 47 Tosti-Leider – waltz
- Op. 48 Husarenliebchen – march-polka
- Op. 49 Derby – quadrille
- Op. 50 Veilchen am Wege – waltz
- Op. 51 Frisch gewagt – march
- Op. 52 Bei Nacht und Nebel – waltz
- Op. 53 Emmeline – polka française
- Op. 54 Stelldichein – march
- Op. 55 Lieb und Lied – waltz
- Op. 57 Jeanette – polka française
- Op. 58 Barcelona – march
- Op. 59 Erwischt! – polka schnell
- Op. 60 Mondnacht auf der Alster – waltz
- Op. 61 Bunte Reihe – lanciers
- Op. 62 Train – march
- Op. 63 Marias Traum – waltz
- Op. 64 Quadrille im Militärstil – quadrille
- Op. 65 Fifi – March
- Op. 66 En tete a tete – lanciers
- Op. 67 Trinket, scherzet! – waltz
- Op. 68 Margaretha – polka-mazurka
- Op. 69 Maskenscherze – quadrille
- Op. 70 Auf rosigem Pfad – waltz
- Op. 71 Geschichten aus dem Sachsenwald – waltz
- Op. 72 Leichtes Element – polka française
- Op. 73 Nervös – polka schnell
- Op. 74 Schalagat – quadrille
- Op. 75 Blaue Augen – blauer Himmel – waltz
- Op. 76 Wissmann – march
- Op. 77 Eichhörnchen – polka schnell
- Op. 78 Der Gladiator – march
- Op. 79 Spielmanns Lieder – waltz
- Op. 80 Strand-Idyllen – waltz
- Op. 82 Dimitri – march
- Op. 83 Fidele – march
- Op. 93 Harvestehuder Schwalben - waltz
- Op. 112 Märchen aus der Quellental – waltz
- Op. 122 Die Königsmaid – waltz
- Op. 126 Redaktionsgeheinmisse – waltz
- Op. 128 La Barcarolle – waltz after motives from Jacques Offenbach's opera
- Op. 137 Carmen – march after motives from Bizet
- Op. 139 Tirol in Lied und Tanz
- Op. 140 Carmen – quadrille after motives from Bizet's opera
- Op. 145 Prisca – waltz (Rupprecht)
- Op. 146 Funkensprache – polka schnell
- Op. 147 Flunkermichel – polka française
- Op. 148 Scheiden und Meiden (Les Adieux) – waltz
- Op. 149 Sommernacht am Rhein – waltz
- Op. 150 Frohsinn auf den Bergen – waltz
- Op. 152 Im 7 Himmel – potpourri
- Op. 153 Liebe schafft Rat – overture
- Op. 154 Freikugeln – march
- Op. 157 Melodien-Parade – march-potpourri
- Op. 163 Offenbach – quadrille after motives from Jacques Offenbach
- Op. 164 Offenbach – waltz
- Op. 165 Wenn die Füsschen sie heben – waltz after motives from Die keusche Susanne von Jean Gilbert
- Op. 166 Wenn der Vater mit dem Sohne – march after motives from Die keusche Susanne von Jean Gilbert
- Op. 167 Hahnen-Rheinländer (Die keusche Susanne – Gilbert) / Kätchen-Rheinländer (Tieck) – polka française
- Op. 168 Die keusche Susanne – potpourri (Gilbert)
- Op. 169 Onegin-Klänge – waltz after motives from Tchaikovsky's opera
- Op. 170 Margueritentag – waltz
- Op. 171 Operetten-Revue – potpourri
- Op. 174 Willst du Liebe lernen? – waltz after motives from Marine-Gust'l von Georg Jarno
- Op. 175 Spanisch-Polnisch – march
- Op. 176 Auf hoher See – march after motives from Marine-Gust'l von Jarno
- Op. 177 Die keusche Susanne – quadrille after motives from Die keusche Susanne von Jean Gilbert
- Op. 178 Die Marine-Gust'l – potpourri (Georg Jarno)
- Op. 179 Truthahn-Tanz – trot de dindon
- Op. 180 Blumenfest – overture
- Op. 188 Skizzen aus Russland – divertissement
- Op. 187 London Beauties - waltz
- Op. 189 Die Wandervögel – march
- Op. 191 Polo-Spiele – intermezzo
- Op. 192 Mia Cara – tango
- Op. 193 Walzerflut oder 100 Jahre in 15 Minuten – chronological waltz-suite
- Op. 194 Die lustigen Marionetten – intermezzo
- Op. 195 Juchhei, Tirolerbub – march
- Op. 196 Souvenir de Chopin – fantasie
- Op. 197 Froh im Kreise – Deutsches Volkslieder Potpourri
- Op. 199 O Deutschland hoch in Ehren – march
- Op. 200 Hurra Hurra die Ulanen sind da – war March 1914
- Op. 201 Hindenburg – march
- Op. 202 Kinderlieder – march
- Op. 203 Verkaufte Braut – march after motives from Smetana's opera
- Op. 204 Andreas Hofer – march
- Op. 205 Nachruf an Schubert – potpourri
- Op. 206 Nachruf an Mendelssohn – potpourri
- Op. 207 Alpensänger – potpourri
- Op. 208 Holzschuh -Tanz – Charakterstück – potpourri
- Op. 209 Künstlerlaune – intermezzo
- Op. 210 Hoffnungssterne – waltz
- Op. 211 Von Bühne zu Bühne – opera fantasie
- Op. 212 Erinnerung an Josef Gung'l – potpourri
- Op. 213 Aus Deutschlands Liederhain – potpourri
- Op. 215 Lumbye-Fantasie – divertissement (Hans Christian Lumbye)
- Op. 216 Nymphe und Faun – waltz after motives from Léo Delibes
- Op. 218 Minutenspiele – potpourri
- Op. 219 Sang und Tanz vom Böhmerland – potpourri
- Op. 222 Russische Volksklänge – potpourri
- Op. 223 Tanzlust auf der Alm – Ländler

== In popular culture ==
"Moonlight on the Alster" is described as being popular with Royal Navy personnel in the novel HMS Ulysses by Alistair MacLean.

== Sources and references ==
- Lexikon des Blasmusikwesens, Freiburg-Tiengen: Blasmusikverlag Schulz, 1988
- La musica en la radio: radio Ciudad Real EAJ 65 y sus discos de pizarra Coordinador: Francisco Alía Miranda Cuenca: Ediciones de la Universidad de Castilla-La Mancha, 2000, p. 321–356
- The heritage encyclopedia of band music: composers and their music. Edited by Paul E. Bierley. William H. Rehrig, Westerville, Ohio: Integrity Press, 1991
- The New Grove Dictionary of Music and Musicians. London: Macmillan, 1980
- Kürschners Deutscher Musiker-Kalender 1954, zweite Ausgabe des Deutschen Musiker-Lexikons. Edited by Hedwig and E.H. Mueller von Asow, Berlin: Walter de Gruyter, 1954
- Sohlman's musiklexikon. Gosta Morin, Carl Allan Moberg. Einar Sundstrom Stockholm: Sohlman Forlag, 1951
- Dizionario universale dei musicisti: Supplemento. Schmidl, Carlo. Milan: Sonzogno, 1938
- Kurzgefasstes Tonkünstler-Lexikon: für Musiker und Freunde der Musik, begründet von Paul Frank. Neu bearbeitet und ergänzt von Wilhelm Altmann. Regensburg: Gustav Bosse, 1936
- Lemma "Fetrás, Oscar". In: Deutsches Musiker-Lexikon. Edited by Erich H. Müller. Dresden: Wilhelm Limpert, 1929, p. 318.
