= Lottbek =

River in Germany

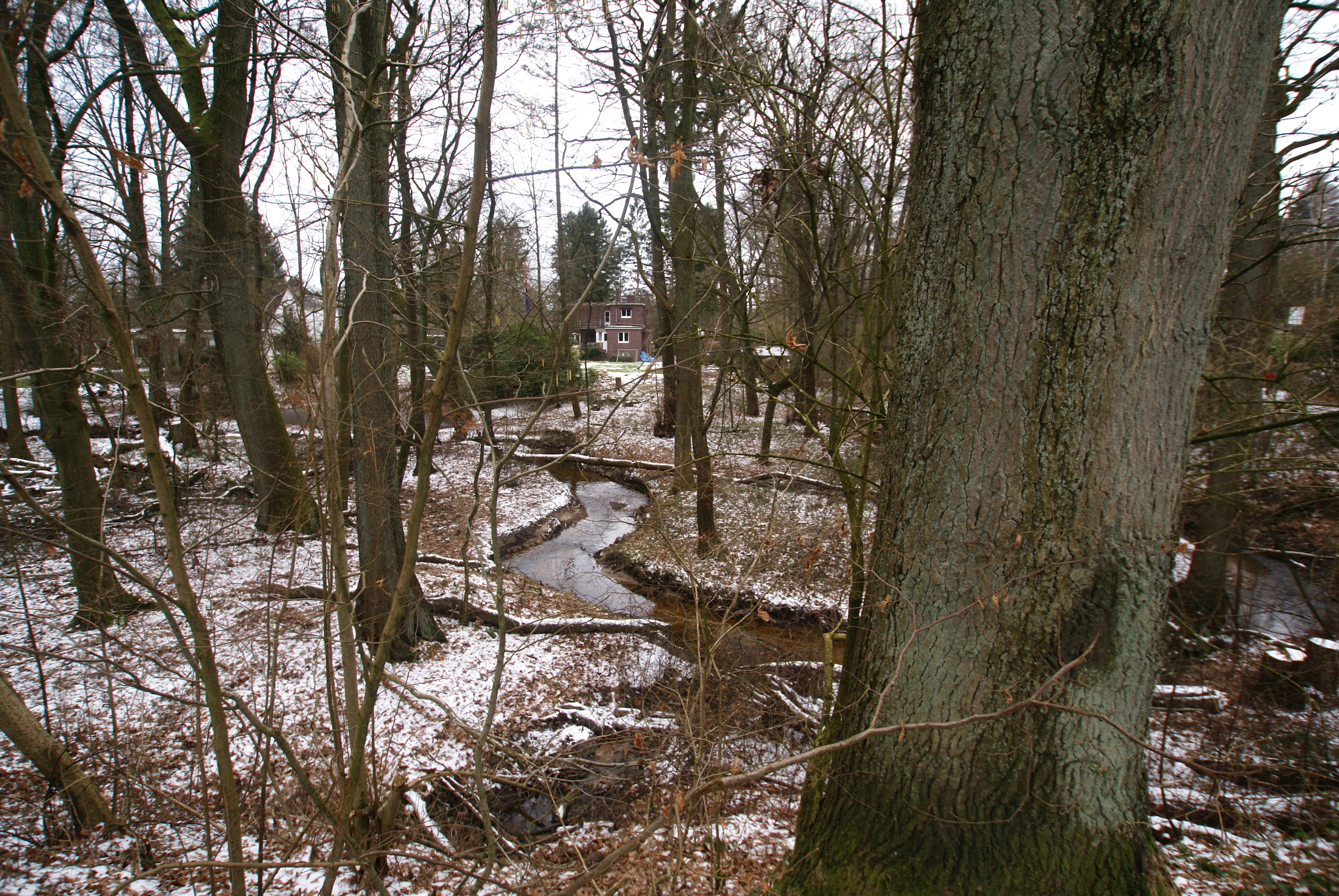

Location
- Country: Germany
- States: Schleswig-Holstein; Hamburg

Physical characteristics
- Mouth
  - location: Bredenbek
  - coordinates: 53.6844°N 10.1321°E

Basin features
- Progression: Bredenbek→ Alster→ Elbe→ North Sea

Lottbek is a small stream in Schleswig-Holstein and Hamburg, Germany. It forms the lower reaches of the Moorbek stream and flows into the Bredenbek near Bergstedt.

== See also ==
- List of rivers of Schleswig-Holstein
- List of rivers of Hamburg
