= Glinder Au =

River in Germany

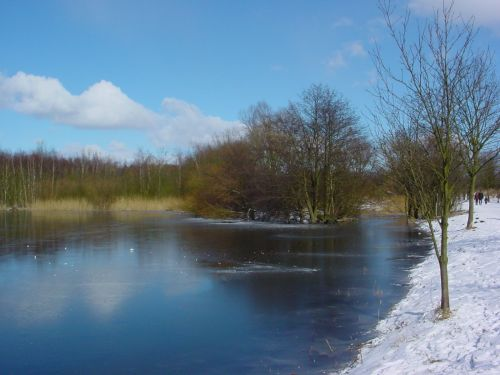

Location
- Country: Germany
- States: Schleswig-Holstein, Hamburg

Physical characteristics
- Mouth
  - location: Bille
  - coordinates: 53.5207°N 10.1216°E
- Length: 17 km (11 mi)

Basin features
- Progression: Bille→ Elbe→ North Sea

The Glinder Au (German pronunciation: [ˈɡlɪndɐ ˈaʊ̯]) is a river of the district Kreis Stormarn in Schleswig-Holstein and Hamburg, Germany. It flows into the Bille in the Hamburg district of Billstedt. The river's gauge was 50 cm (on November 10, 2025).

About 17 km long, the river rises in the southern part of the Brunsbek municipality (near the Kronshorst area).

== Natural History ==
The valley of the Glinder Au formed at the end of the last ice age (Weichsel glaciation). In certain stretches (especially around Stemwarde) the river is designated as a protected biotope, with alder-ash floodplain woods (Erlen-Eschen-Auwald) and reed vegetation. The river is classified as “significantly altered” (in German: „erheblich verändert“) under the EU Water Framework Directive.

== Historical & Human Usage ==
Historically, several water-mills were built along the river: for example, in Glinde the “Glinder Mühle”, in Domhorst a mill, and others in the Hamburg section. In the 1970s, due to intense gravel extraction north of the Glinder Mühlenteich, sections of the Glinder Au disappeared underground (“versickert”) before being restored via recultivation.

== Ecological Management ==
The river functions as a drainage channel (“Vorfluter”) for its catchment area. The monitoring and maintenance are done by the “Wasser- und Bodenverband Glinder Au/Wandse”. The river flows through the landscape-protection and nature-areas including the Kronshorst, Stemwarde and Glinde zones.

== See also ==
- List of rivers of Schleswig-Holstein
- List of rivers of Hamburg
