= Flottbek =

Flottbek may refer to:

- Flottbek (Elbe), a river of Hamburg, Germany, tributary of the Elbe
- the joint name of
  - Groß Flottbek, a quarter of Hamburg, Germany
  - Klein Flottbek, a sub-urban district near Hamburg, Germany
