= Tarpenbek =

River in Germany

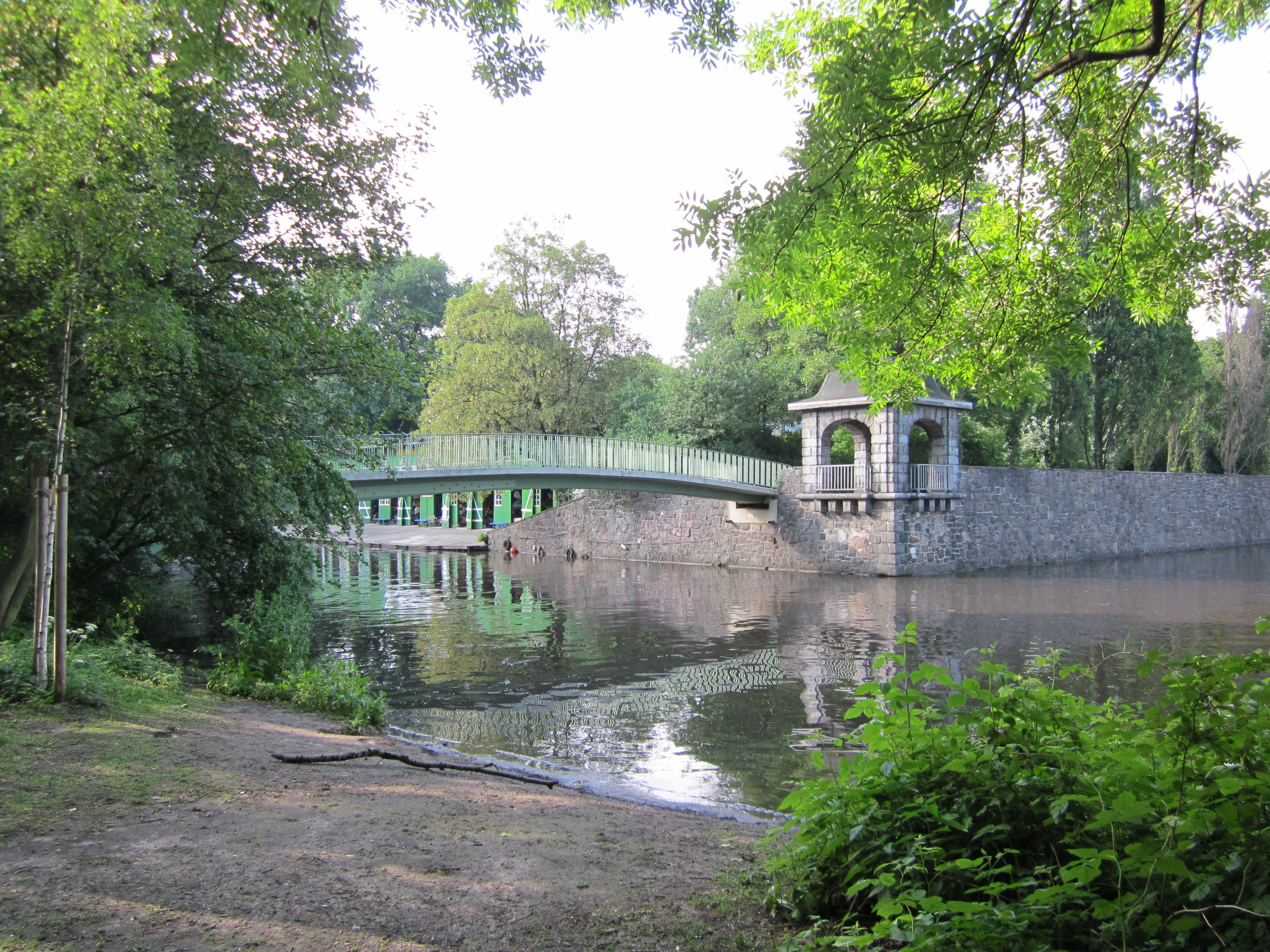
- Tarpenbek at its confluence with the Alster

Location
- Country: Germany
- States: Schleswig-Holstein; Hamburg

Physical characteristics
- Mouth
  - location: Alster
  - coordinates: 53.5967°N 9.9897°E
- Length: 20.9 km (13.0 mi)

Basin features
- Progression: Alster→ Elbe→ North Sea

Tarpenbek is a stream running from Norderstedt (Schleswig-Holstein) through parts of Hamburg before joining the Alster in Eppendorf.

== See also ==
- List of rivers of Schleswig-Holstein
- List of rivers of Hamburg
