= Wedeler Au =

River in Germany

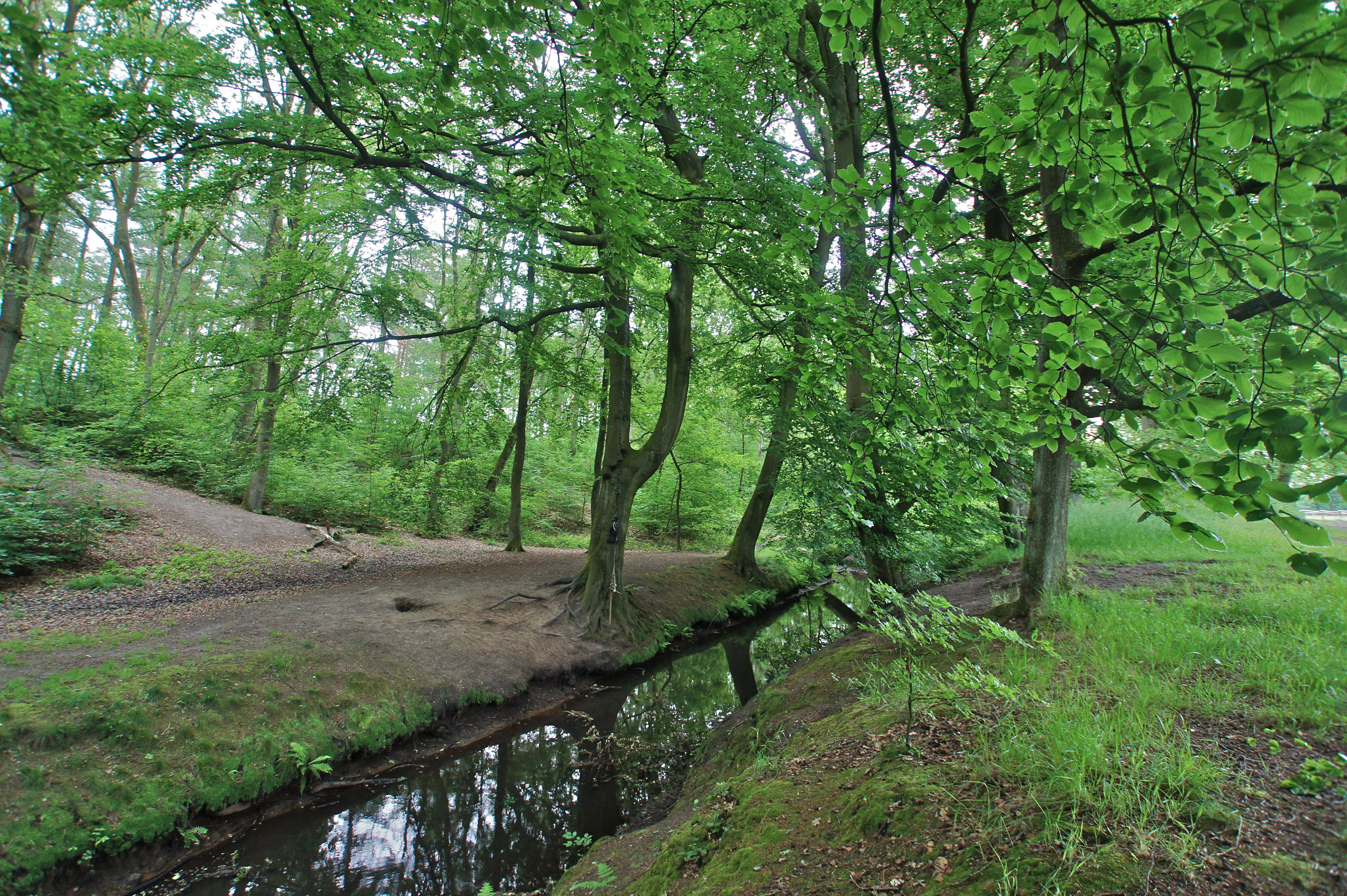

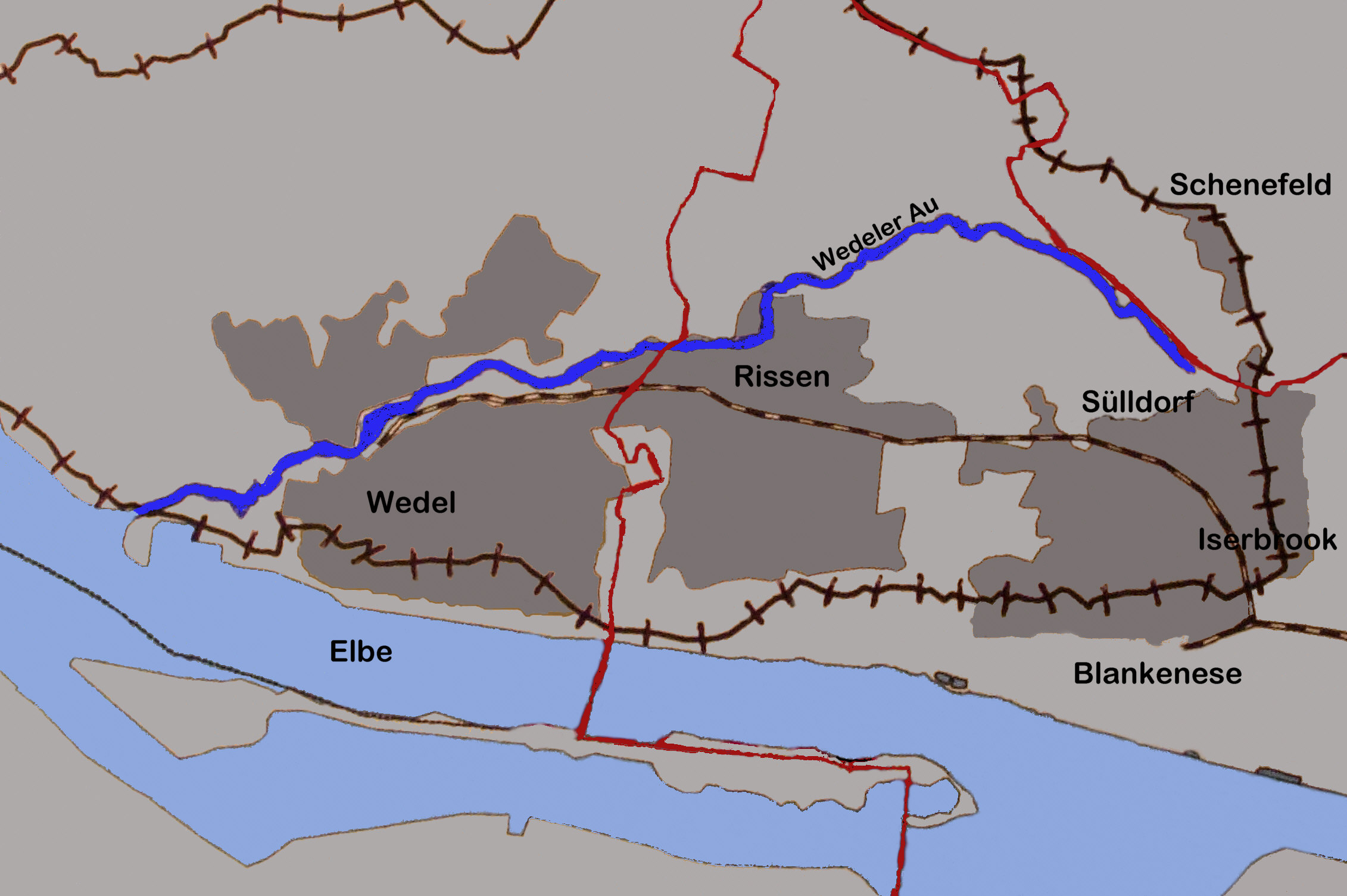
- Map of the river and its drainage basin

Location
- Country: Germany
- States: Hamburg; Schleswig-Holstein

Physical characteristics
- Source
  - location: Sülldorf
  - elevation: 18 m (59 ft)
- Mouth
  - location: Elbe near Wedel
  - coordinates: 53.5761°N 9.6711°E
  - elevation: 1 m (3.3 ft)
- Length: 12.6 km (7.8 mi)

Basin features
- Progression: Elbe→ North Sea

Wedeler Au (German pronunciation: [ˈveːdəlɐ ˈaʊ̯]; in older texts also named Wedelbe(c)k) is a river of Hamburg and Schleswig-Holstein, Germany. It flows into the Elbe near Wedel.

== Gallery ==
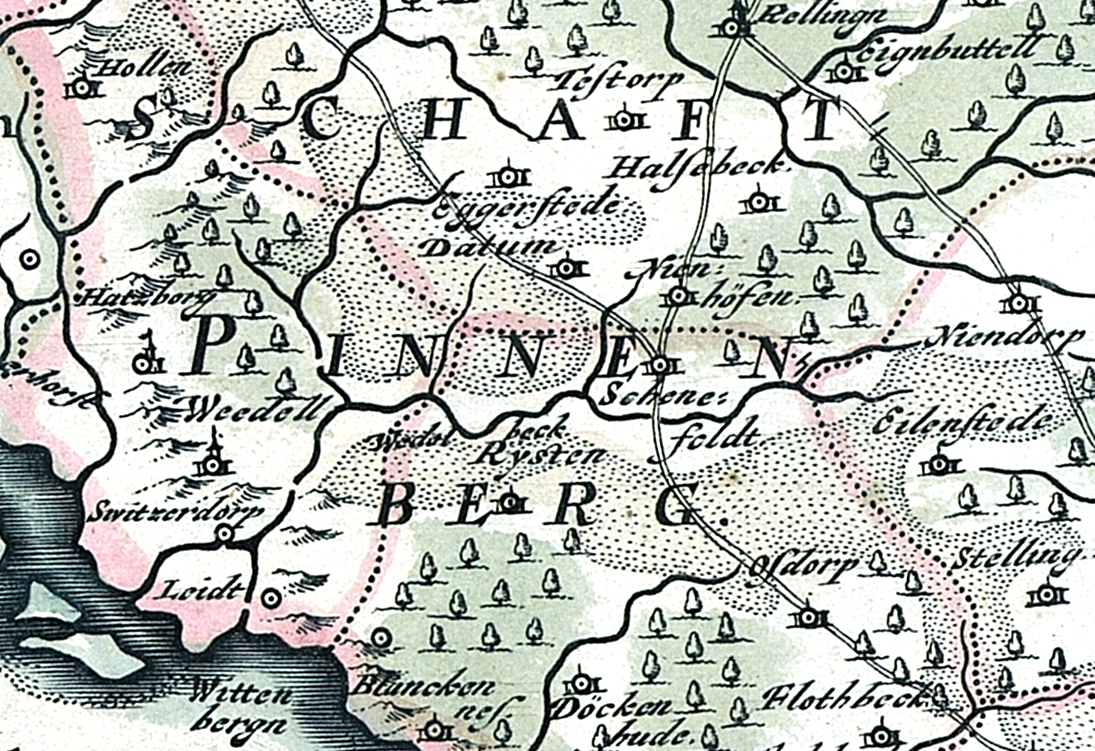
Wedelbe(c)k in 1650

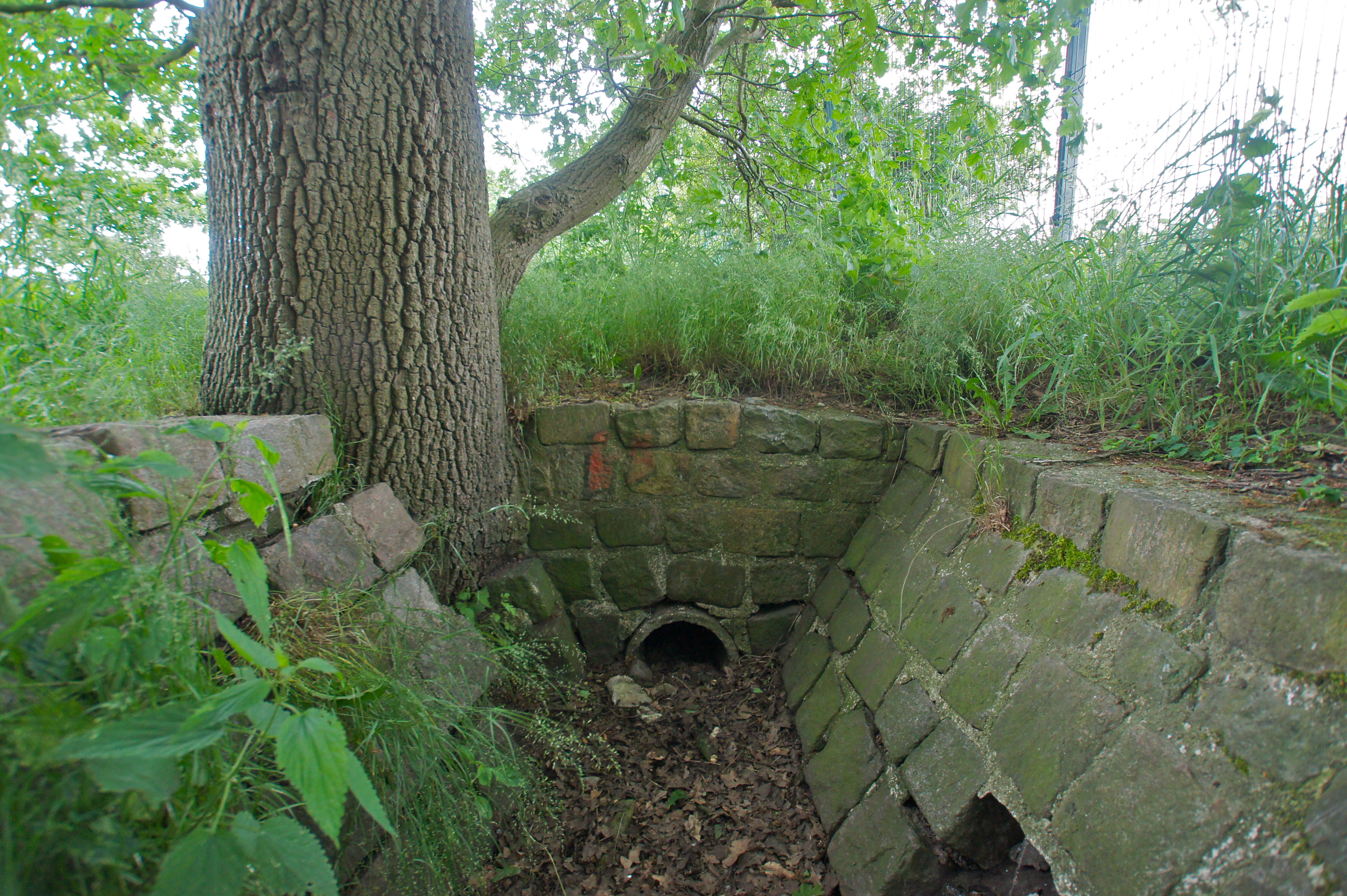
The spring in Sülldorf

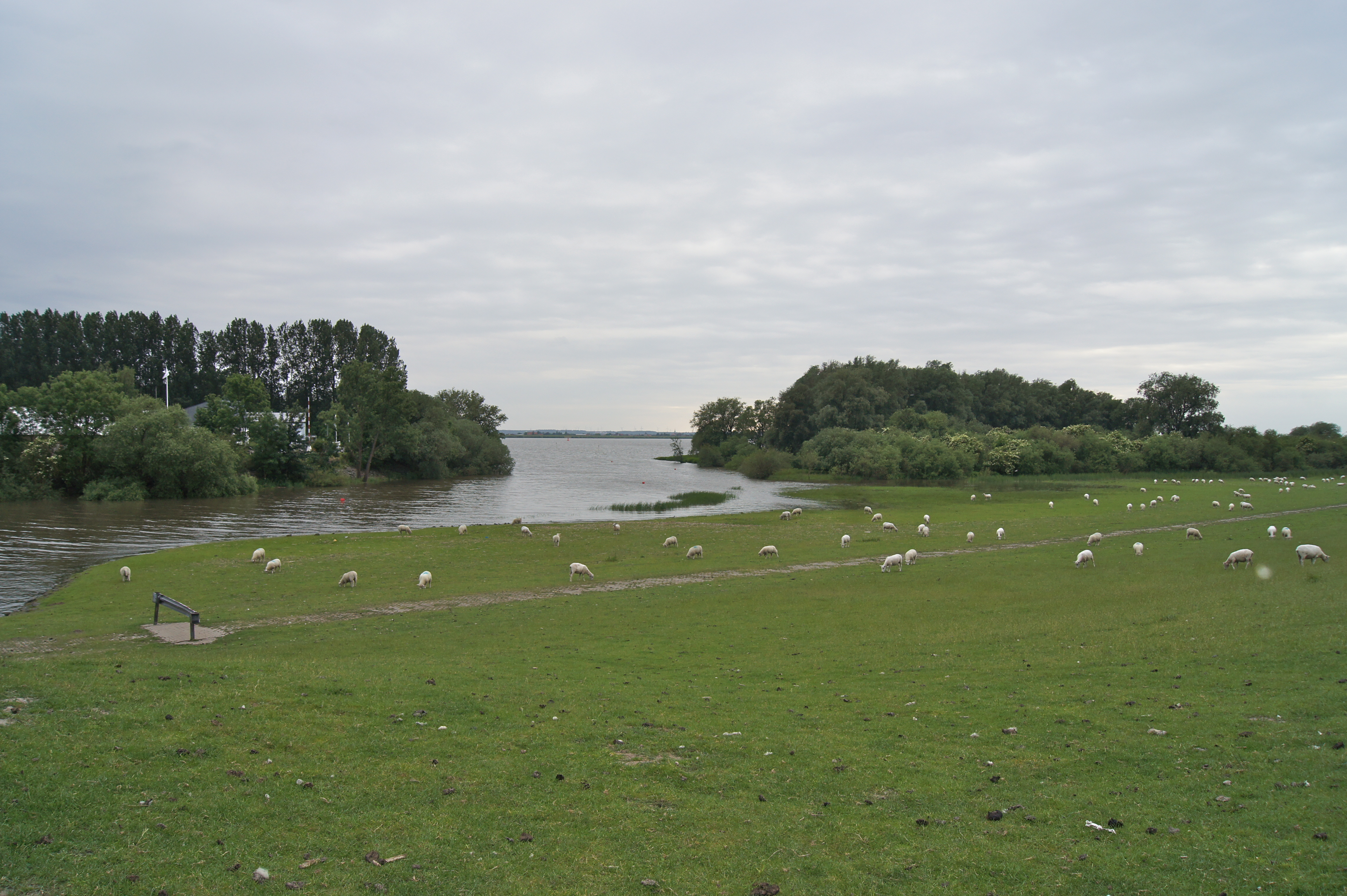
The confluence with the Elbe in Wedel

== See also ==
- List of rivers of Hamburg
- List of rivers of Schleswig-Holstein
