= Berner Au =

River in Germany

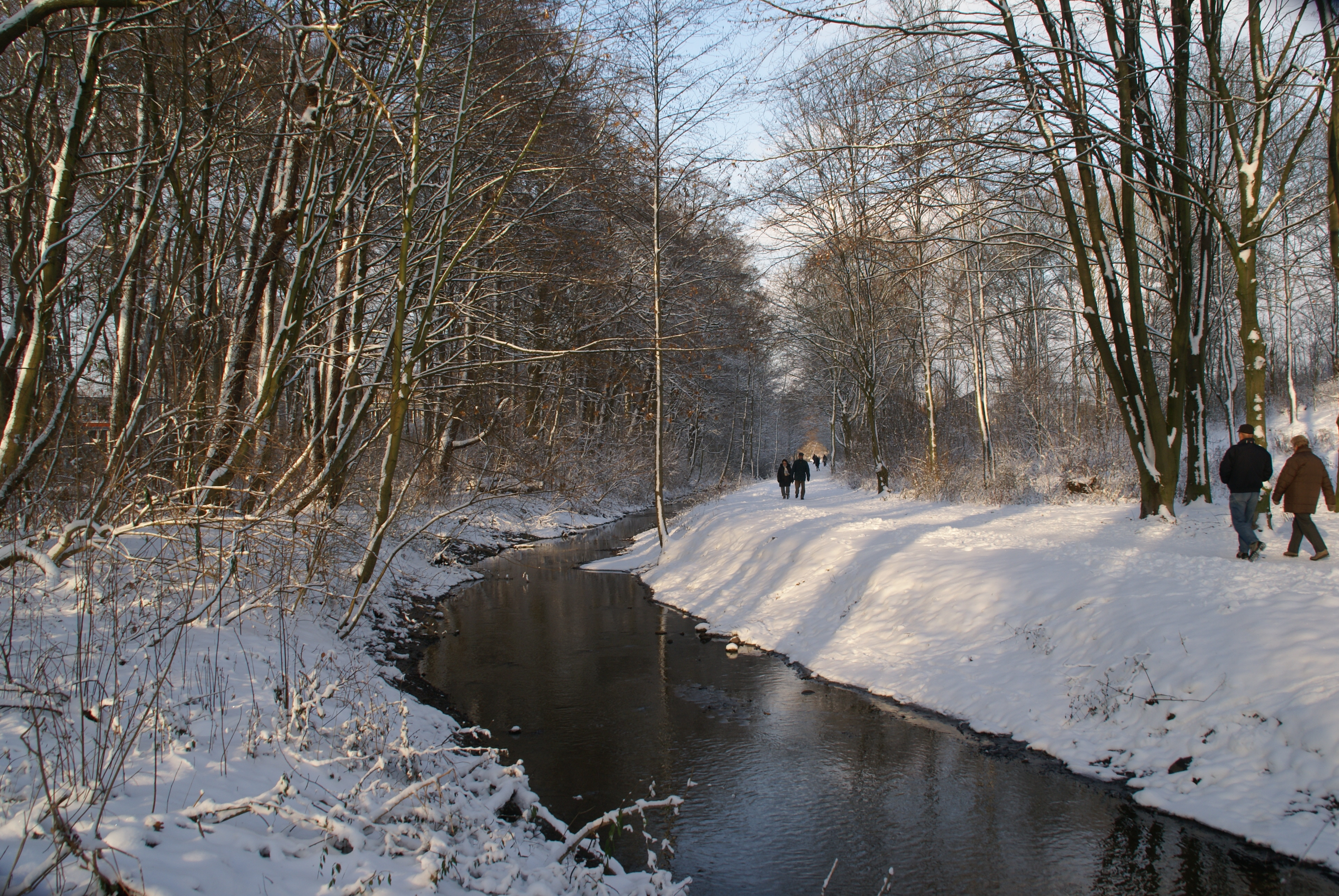

Location
- Country: Germany
- Location: Hamburg

Physical characteristics
- Mouth
  - location: Wandse
  - coordinates: 53.5923°N 10.1157°E
- Length: 8.3 km (5.2 mi)

Basin features
- Progression: Wandse→ Alster→ Elbe→ North Sea

Berner Au is a small river of Hamburg, Germany. It flows into the Wandse near Tonndorf (a district of Wandsbek).

== See also ==
- List of rivers of Hamburg
