= List of rivers of Hamburg =

A list of rivers of Hamburg, Germany:

== A ==
- Alster

== B ==
- Berner Au
- Bille
- Bredenbek

== D ==
- Deepenhorngraben
- Dove Elbe
- Dradenau
- Düpenau

== E ==
- Elbe
- Este

== F ==
- Flottbek

== G ==
- Glinder Au
- Gose Elbe

== K ==
- Köhlbrand
- Kollau

== L ==
- Ladenbek
- Lottbek
- Luruper Moorgraben

== M ==
- Müllergraben

== N ==
- Niederelbe
- Norderelbe

== O ==
- Osterbek
- Ottersbek

== P ==
- Pepermölenbek

== R ==
- Rahlau
- Reiherstieg
- Rethe
- Rodenbek

== S ==
- Saselbek
- Schillingsbek
- Schleemer Bach
- Seebek
- Süderelbe

== T ==
- Tarpenbek

== U ==
- Unterelbe

== W ==
- Wandse
- Wedeler Au
