= Ladenbek =

River in Germany

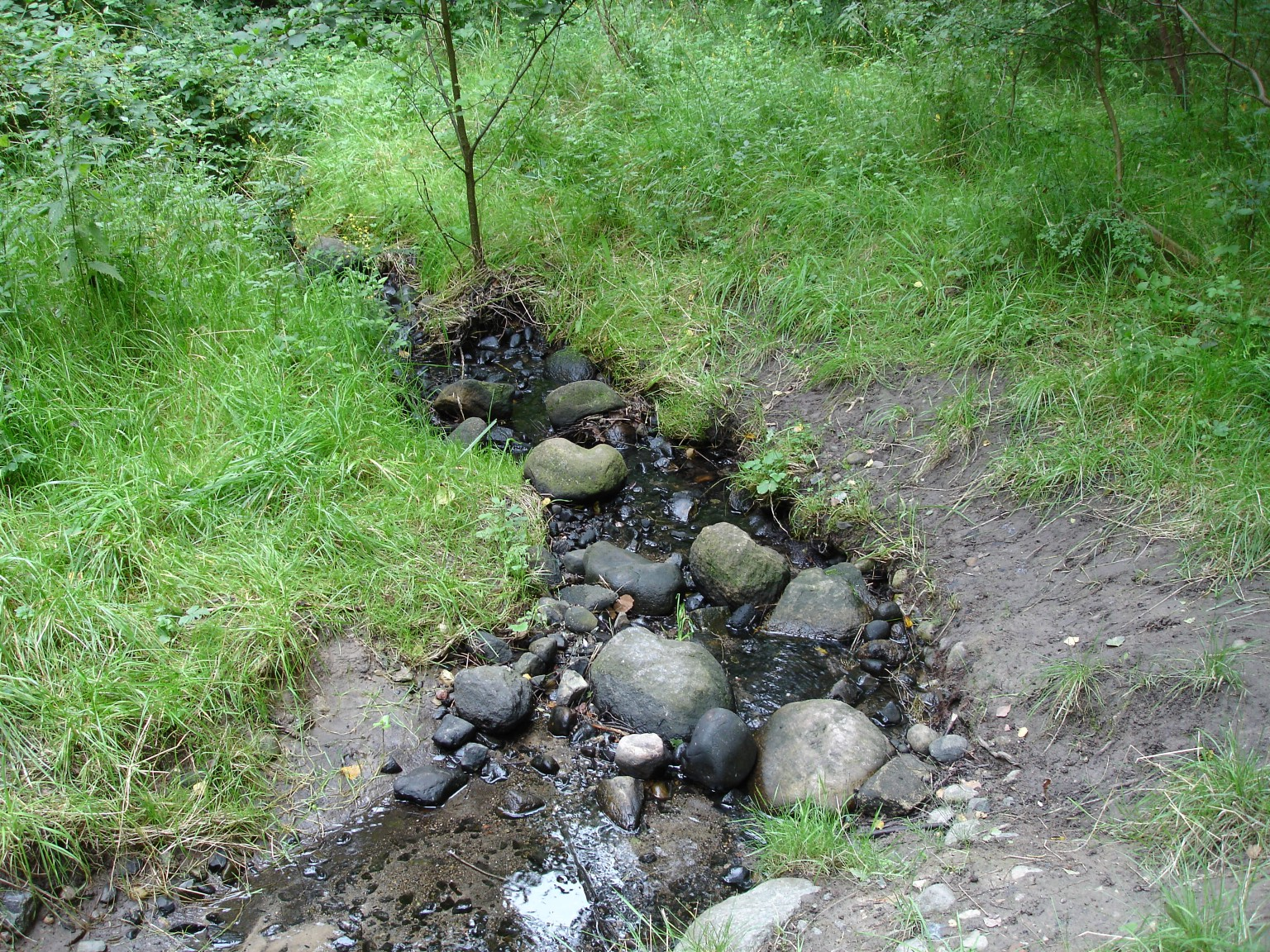

Location
- Country: Germany
- States: Hamburg

Physical characteristics
- Mouth
  - location: Bille
  - coordinates: 53.4979°N 10.1822°E

Basin features
- Progression: Bille→ Elbe→ North Sea

Ladenbek is a small river of Hamburg, Germany. It flows into the Bille near Hamburg-Lohbrügge.

== See also ==
- List of rivers of Hamburg
