= Schleemer Bach =

River in Germany

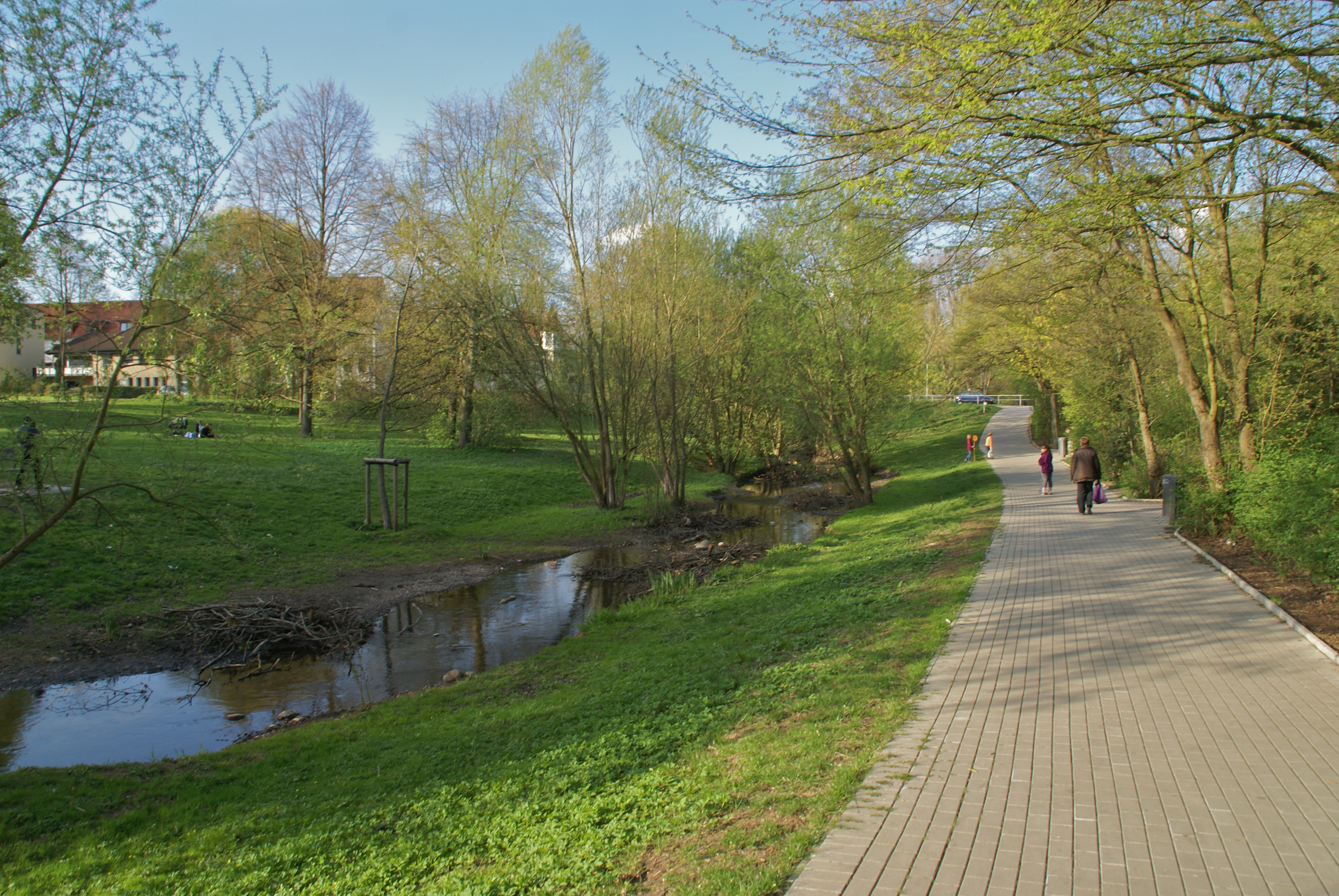

Location
- Country: Germany
- States: Hamburg

Physical characteristics
- Source
  - elevation: 28 m (92 ft)
- Mouth
  - location: Bille
  - coordinates: 53.5334°N 10.1117°E
- Length: 10 km (6.2 mi)

Basin features
- Progression: Bille→ Elbe→ North Sea

Schleemer Bach is a river of Hamburg, Germany. It flows into the Bille near Hamburg-Billstedt.

== See also ==
- List of rivers of Hamburg
