= Dradenau =

River in Germany

Coordinates: 53°31′17″N 9°54′01″E

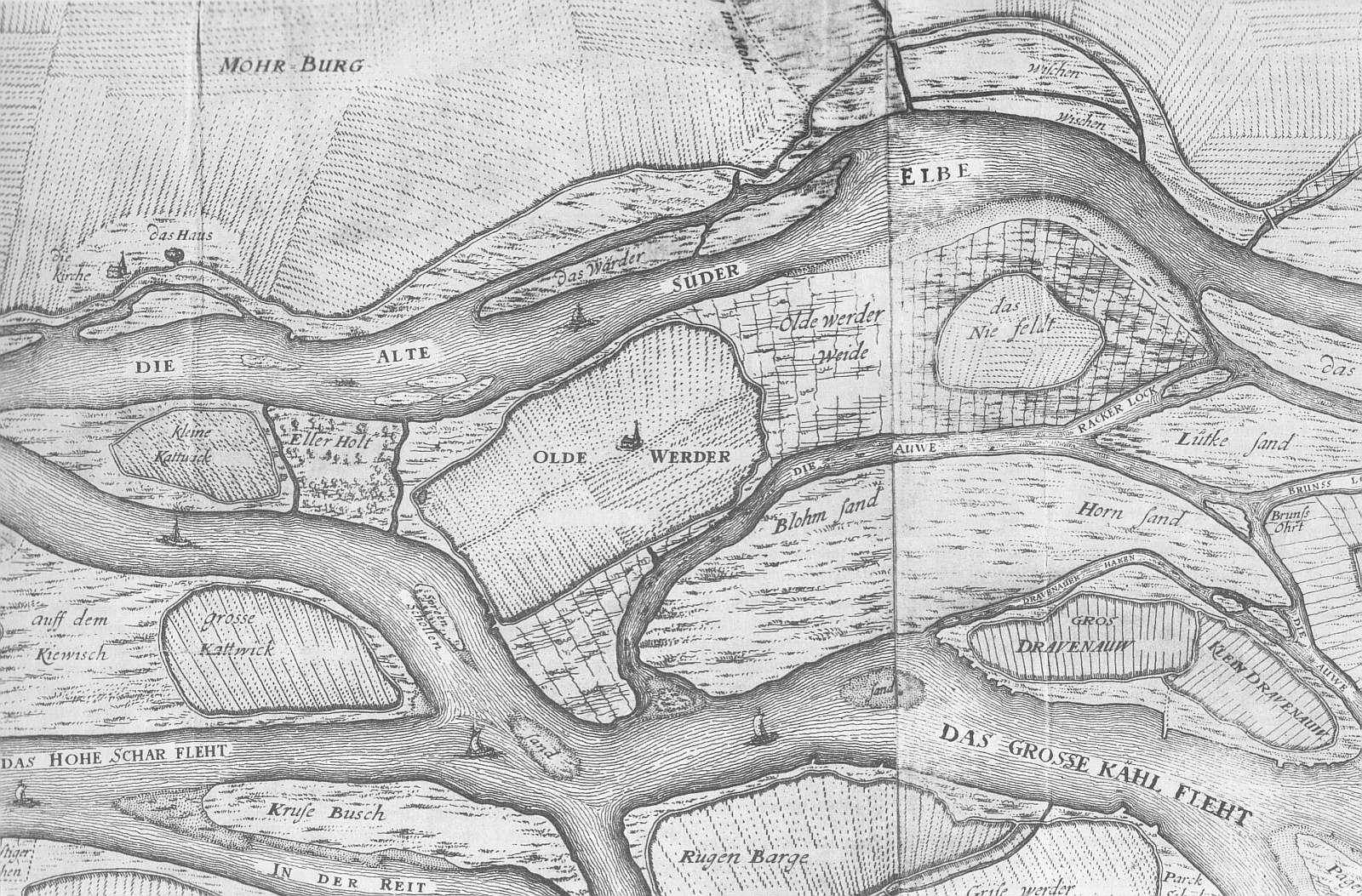
- Dradenau depicted on a 1702 map of Hamburg (lower right)

Location
- Country: Germany
- State: Hamburg

Physical characteristics
- Length: 0.85 km (0.53 mi)

Dradenau was a branch of the river Elbe near Hamburg, Germany. The name was also used for two islands created by the channel, Gros Dradenau and Klein Dradenau (Big and Little Dradenau).

The islands of Dradenau were sold to Hamburg in 1445 by Count Otto von Holstein. By 1840, it was leased as private property with two farms and 66 inhabitants. As part of the Hamburg port extensions, the Köhlfleet, another channel north of Dradenau channel, was reclaimed, which connected the islands to Waltershof, an area of Hamburg. By the late 19th century, the channel disappeared entirely due to silting and the construction of the port of Hamburg. A sewage treatment plant, Klärwerk Dradenau, currently exists where it used to flow.

== See also ==
- List of rivers of Hamburg
