= Rahlau =

River in Germany

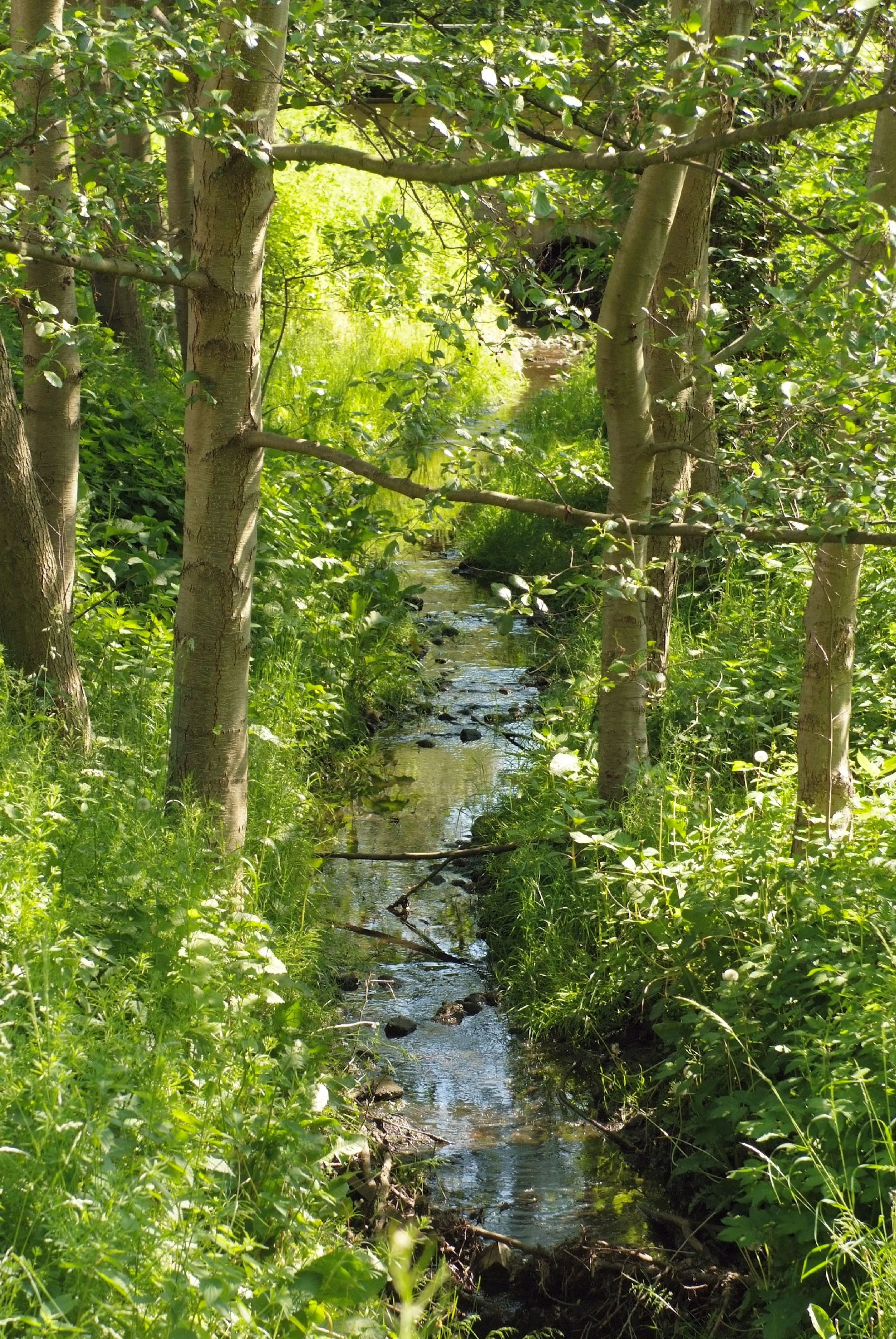

Location
- Country: Germany
- States: Hamburg

Physical characteristics
- Mouth
  - location: Wandse
  - coordinates: 53.5814°N 10.0996°E

Basin features
- Progression: Wandse→ Alster→ Elbe→ North Sea

Rahlau (German pronunciation: [ˈʁaːlaʊ]) is a river of Hamburg, Germany. It flows into the Wandse in Wandsbek.

== See also ==
- List of rivers of Hamburg
