= Rahlstedt Cemetery =

Cemetery in Hamburg, Germany

Coordinates: 53°35′33″N 10°09′18″E

Rahlstedter Friedhof
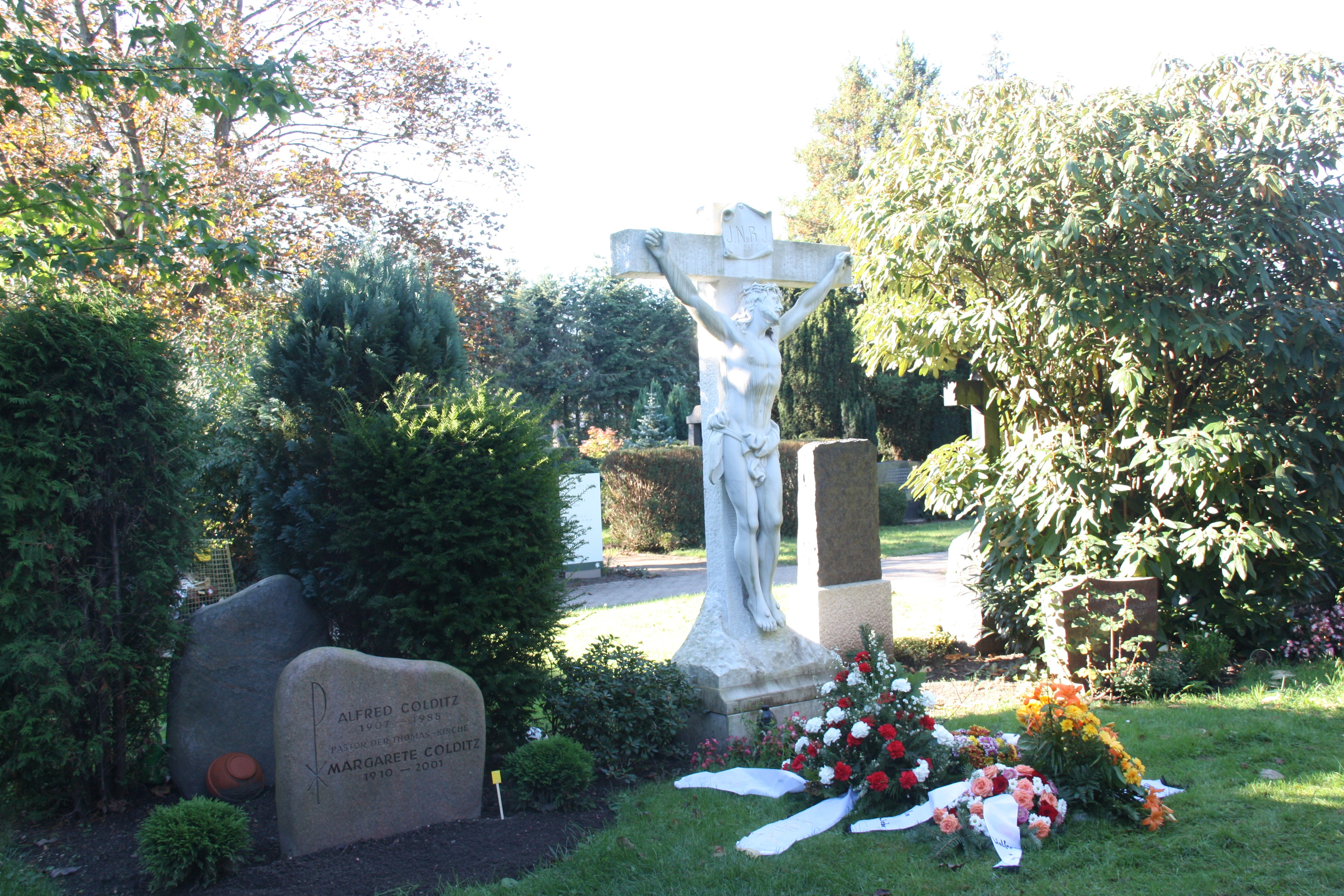
- The large marble crucifix and graves of the pastors
- Interactive map of Rahlstedter Friedhof

Details
- Established: 1829
- Location: Hamburg
- Country: Germany
- Type: Protestant cemetery
- Size: 8.5 ha
- No. of graves: 19,000
- Website: Official website

The Lutheran Rahlstedt Cemetery (German: Rahlstedter Friedhof) is a church-operated historic burial ground in Hamburg, Germany. The cemetery is owned by the Evangelical Lutheran parish church of Old Rahlstedt, Hamburg.

== History and description ==
The cemetery was established in 1829. It has a size of 8.5 hectares and it contains 19,000 graves. The oldest preserved tombstone dates back to 1837, belonging to a woman named Sophie Dorothea Freerks. There is a separate plot adjacent to the cemetery chapel reserved for the pastors. A large marble crucifix dominates the area since 1964, which was originally on the altar of the Old Rahlstedt parish church and later transferred to the cemetery.

== Selected notable burials ==
Notable people buried here include:

- Detlev von Liliencron (1844–1909), German lyric poet and novelist from Kiel

== Gallery ==
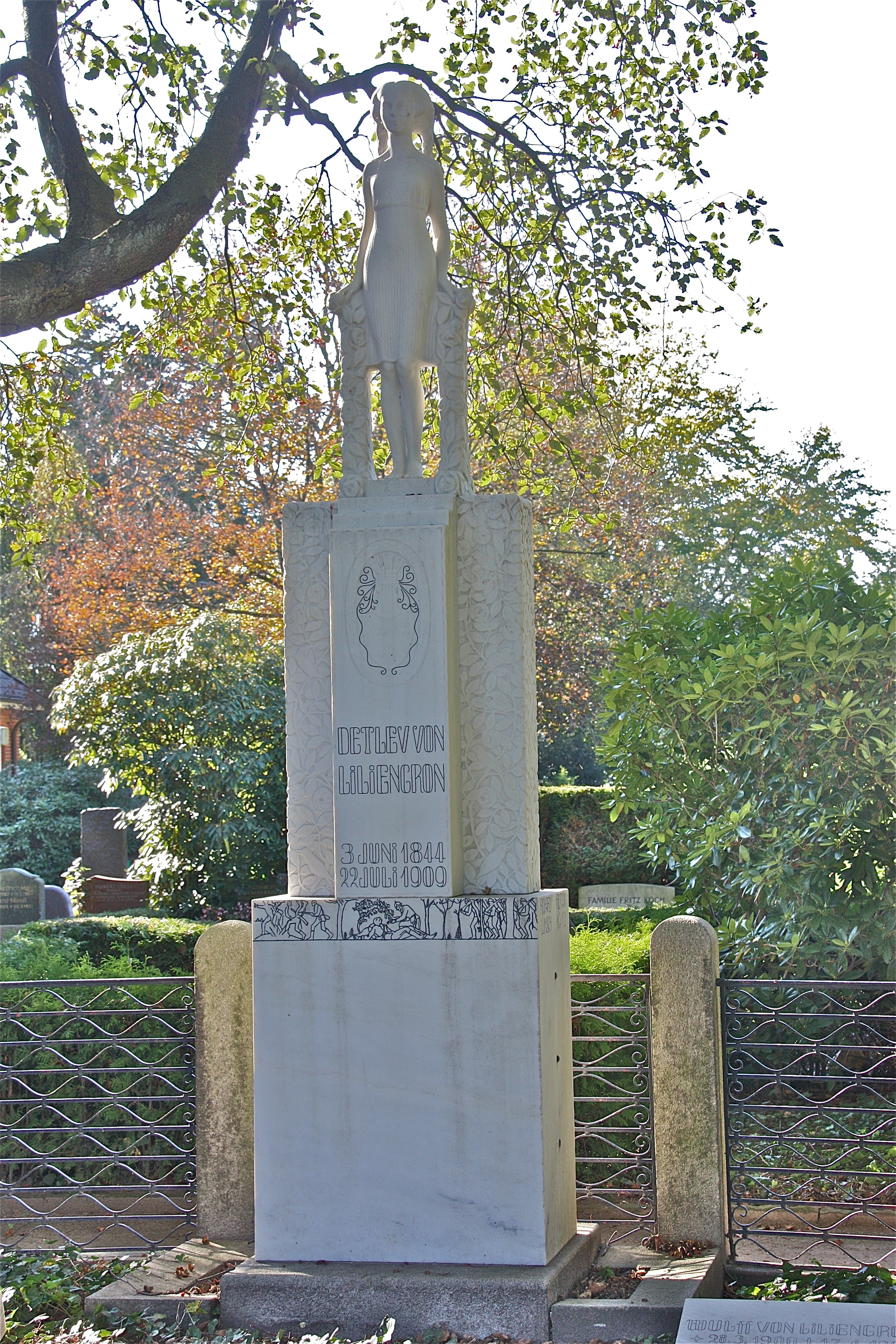

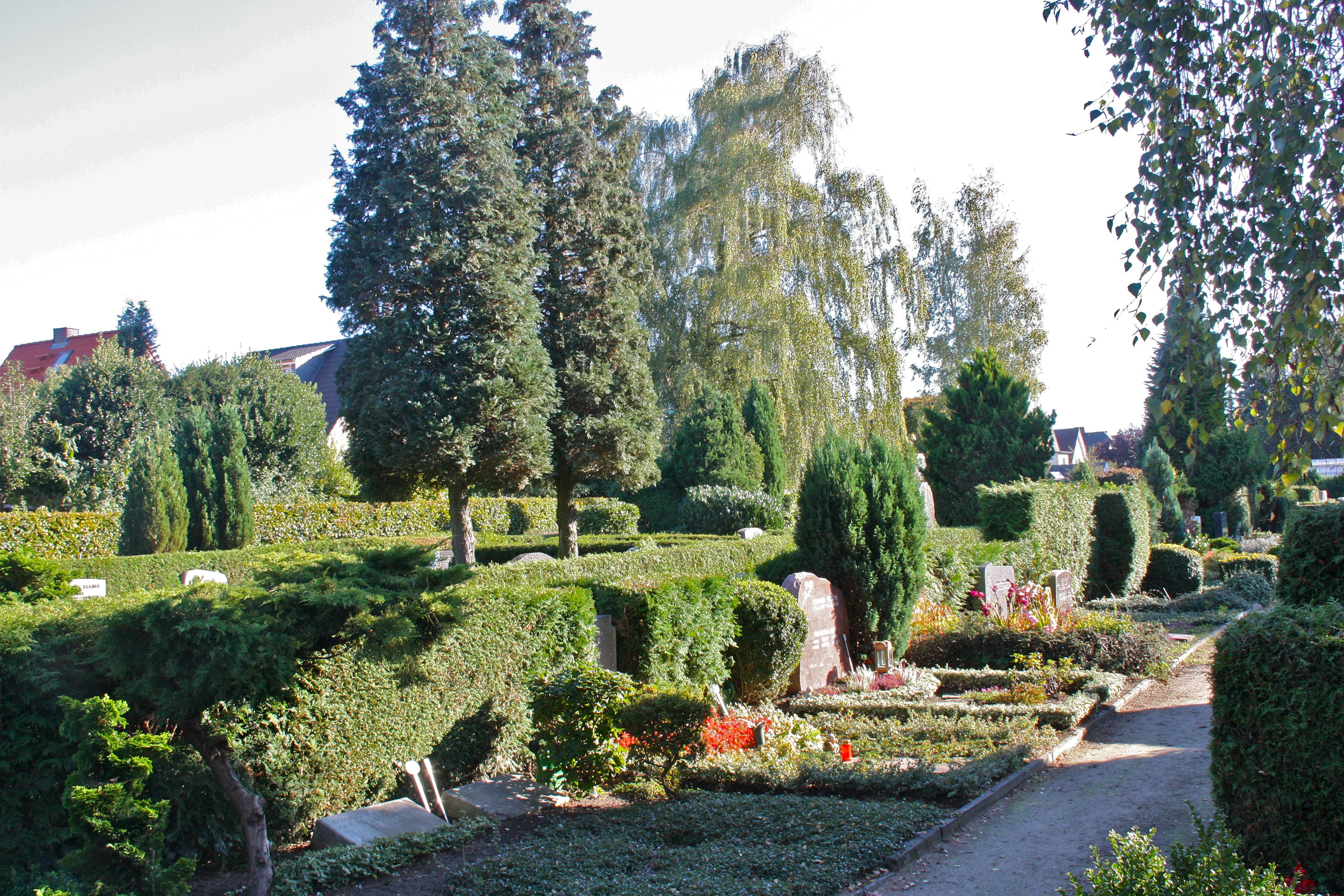

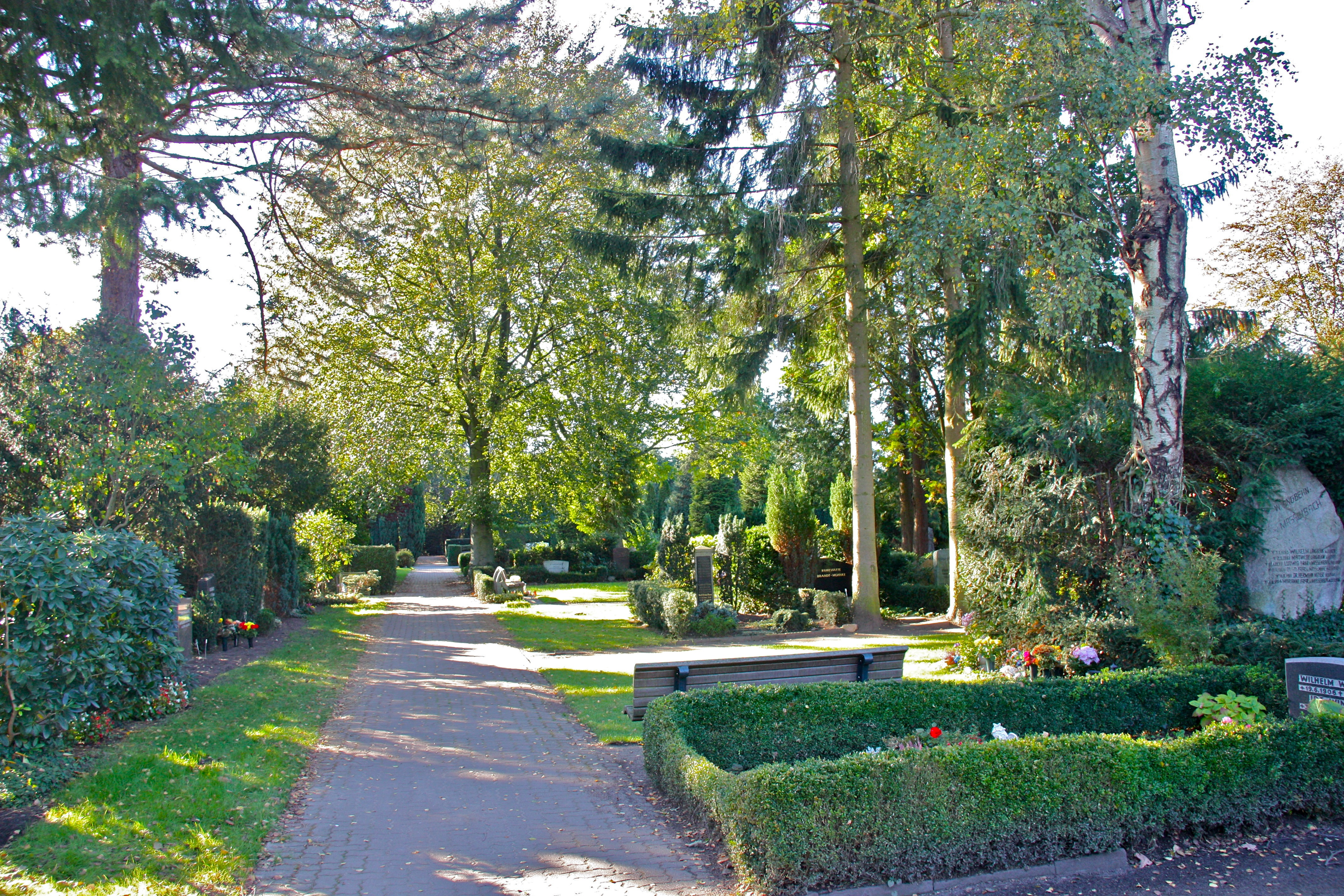
