= Pepermölenbek =

River in Germany

Location
- Country: Germany
- State: Hamburg

Physical characteristics
- Mouth
  - location: Elbe
  - coordinates: 53°32′49″N 9°57′13″E

Basin features
- Progression: Elbe→ North Sea

Pepermölenbek was a small river of Hamburg, Germany. It flowed into the Elbe in Hamburg-St. Pauli. It used to be the border between the then danish city Altona and a suburb of Hamburg called Hamburger-Berge.

== See also ==
- List of rivers of Hamburg
