= Detlev von Liliencron =

German lyric poet and novelist

Detlev Freiherr von Liliencron
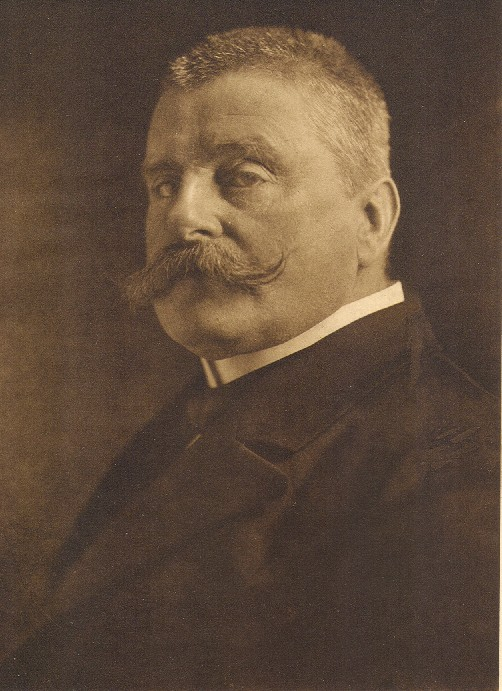
- Detlev von Liliencron, 1905; photograph by Rudolf Dührkoop
- Born: Friedrich Adolf Axel Detlev Liliencron; 3 June 1844; Kiel, Duchy of Holstein (now Schleswig-Holstein, Germany)
- Died: 22 July 1909 (aged 65); Alt-Rahlstedt (now Hamburg), Germany
- Resting place: Rahlstedt Cemetery
- Occupations: lyric poet, novelist
- Known for: Adjutantenritte

Baron Detlev von Liliencron born Friedrich Adolf Axel von Liliencron (3 June 1844 in Kiel – 22 July 1909) was a German poet and novelist from Kiel.

== Biography ==
Liliencron was the son of Louis (Ludwig) Freiherr von Liliencron and Adeline von Harten. He entered the Prussian army and took part in the campaigns of 1866 and 1870–71 (Franco-Prussian War), in both of which he was wounded. In 1875, he retired with the rank of captain and spent some time in America (1875 to 1877), afterwards settling at Kellinghusen in Holstein, where he remained until 1887. After some time at Munich, he settled in Altona and later at Alt-Rahlstedt, now a part of Hamburg.

== Assessment ==
Liliencron was one of the most eminent of German lyric poets of his time; his Adjutantenritte, with its fresh original style, broke with the well-worn literary conventions then prevalent which had been handed down from the middle of the century. Rainer Maria Rilke, among others, was heavily influenced by Liliencron's poems. According to the Encyclopædia Britannica Eleventh Edition, Liliencron's work is somewhat uneven, since he lacked the sustained power which makes a prose writer successful.

== Music ==
His poems were set to music, such as "Auf dem Kirchhofe" by Johannes Brahms as No. 4 of his Fünf Lieder, Op. 105. German composers Luise Schulze-Berghof (1889-1970) and Pauline Volkstein (1849-1925) also set Liliencron's text to music.

== Works ==
He first attracted attention by the volume of poems, Adjutantenritte und andere Gedichte (1883), which was followed by several unsuccessful dramas, a volume of short stories, Eine Sommerschlacht (1886), and a novel Breide Hummelsbüttel (1887).

Other collections of short stories appeared under the titles Unter flatternden Fahnen (1888). Der Mäcen (1889), Krieg und Frieden (1891); of lyric poetry in 1889, 1890 (Der Heidegänger und andere Gedichte), 1893, and 1903 (Bunte Beute). Interesting, too, is the humorous epic Poggfred (1896; 2nd ed. 1904).

Liliencron's complete works were published in 14 volumes (1904–1905); his Gedichte having been previously collected in four volumes under the titles Kampf und Spiele, Kämpfe und Ziele, Nebel und Sonne and Bunte Beute (1897–1903).

== Selected poems in translation ==
- H. Fiedler (trans.): Book of German Verse. Luther to Liliencron. Oxford 1916.

== Sources ==
- H. Stolte: Detlev von Liliencron. Husum 1980.
- E. Maletzke: Detlev von Liliencron. Poet und Schuldenbaron. Neumünster 2011.
