= Bredenbek (Alster) =

River in Germany

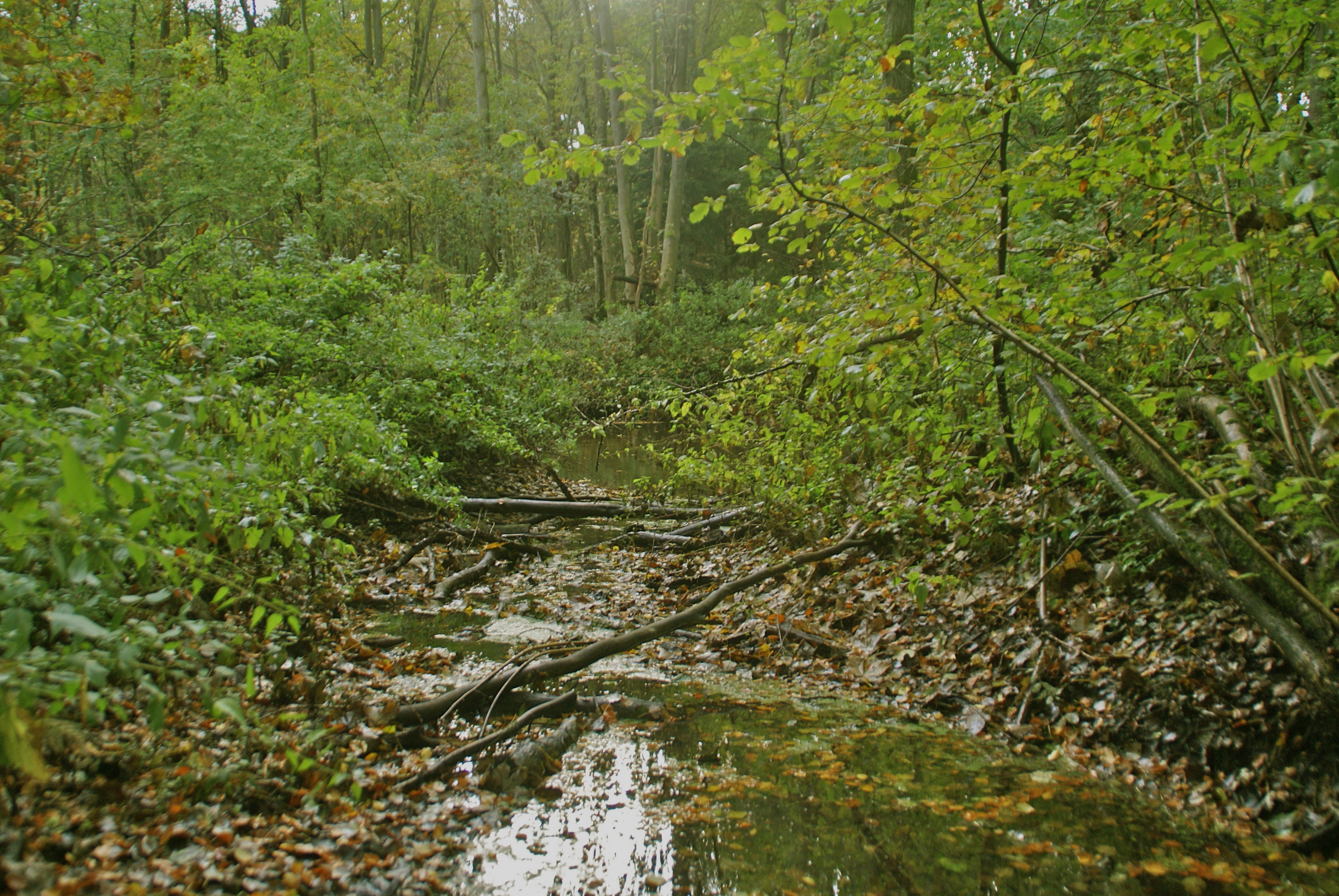

Location
- Country: Germany
- States: Schleswig-Holstein, Hamburg

Physical characteristics
- Source
  - elevation: 24.5 m (80 ft)
- Mouth
  - location: Alster
  - coordinates: 53.6857°N 10.1167°E
  - elevation: 13 m (43 ft)
- Length: 8 km (5.0 mi)

Basin features
- Progression: Alster→ Elbe→ North Sea

Bredenbek is a small river of Schleswig-Holstein and Hamburg, Germany. It flows into the Alster near Hamburg-Bergstedt.

== See also ==
- List of rivers of Hamburg
- List of rivers of Schleswig-Holstein
