= Wandse =

River in Germany

Wandse Eilbek, Eilbekkanal
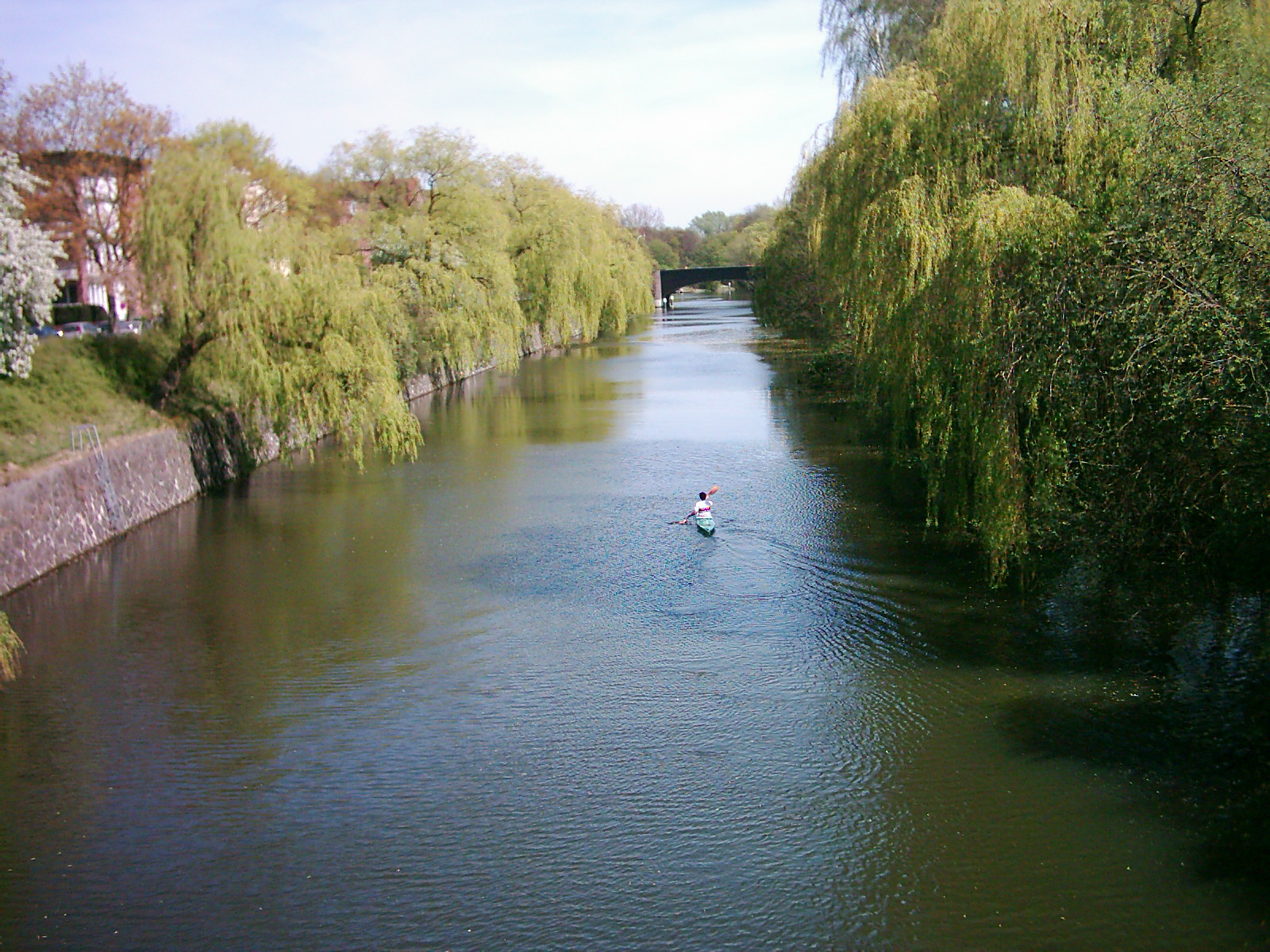
- Wandse as Eilbekkanal in Hamburg

Location
- Country: Germany
- States: Schleswig-Holstein; Hamburg

Physical characteristics
- Source
  - location: Siek
  - coordinates: 53°38′26″N 10°16′46″E
  - elevation: 54 m (177 ft)
- Mouth: Alster (Außenalster)
  - location: Hohenfelde, Hamburg
  - coordinates: 53°33′56″N 10°0′59″E
  - elevation: 6 m (20 ft)
- Length: 20 km (12 mi)
- Discharge
  - average: 7.0 m^{3}/s (250 cu ft/s)

Basin features
- Tributaries
  - left: Stellau, Rahlau
  - right: Berner Au
- Progression: Alster→ Elbe→ North Sea

Wandse (German pronunciation: [ˈvantsə]; in sections also called Eilbek) is a river flowing through Schleswig-Holstein and Hamburg, Germany.

The Wandse rises west of the village of Siek in Kreis Stormarn in Schleswig-Holstein and ends in the center of Hamburg in the Alster. Along the banks of the Wandse there were many water mills. The river passes through the settlements of Siek, Braak, Stapelfeld, and Hamburg.

The Hamburg district of Wandsbek takes its name from the river as it winds its way westwards via the Eichtal Park, a public urban park. After passing through the Mühlenteich pond, the river continues as Eilbek (later Eilbekkanal), eponymous to the Eilbek district. The canal joins the Alster in the heart of Hamburg at Außenalster.

== Meander restoration ==
The River Wandse is a site of interest for river management and conservation due to a pioneering project carried out in 1982 to restore the original meanders to an engineered section of the river flowing through the national park.

== See also ==
- List of rivers of Schleswig-Holstein
- List of rivers of Hamburg
- List of bridges in Hamburg
