= Alster =

River in Germany

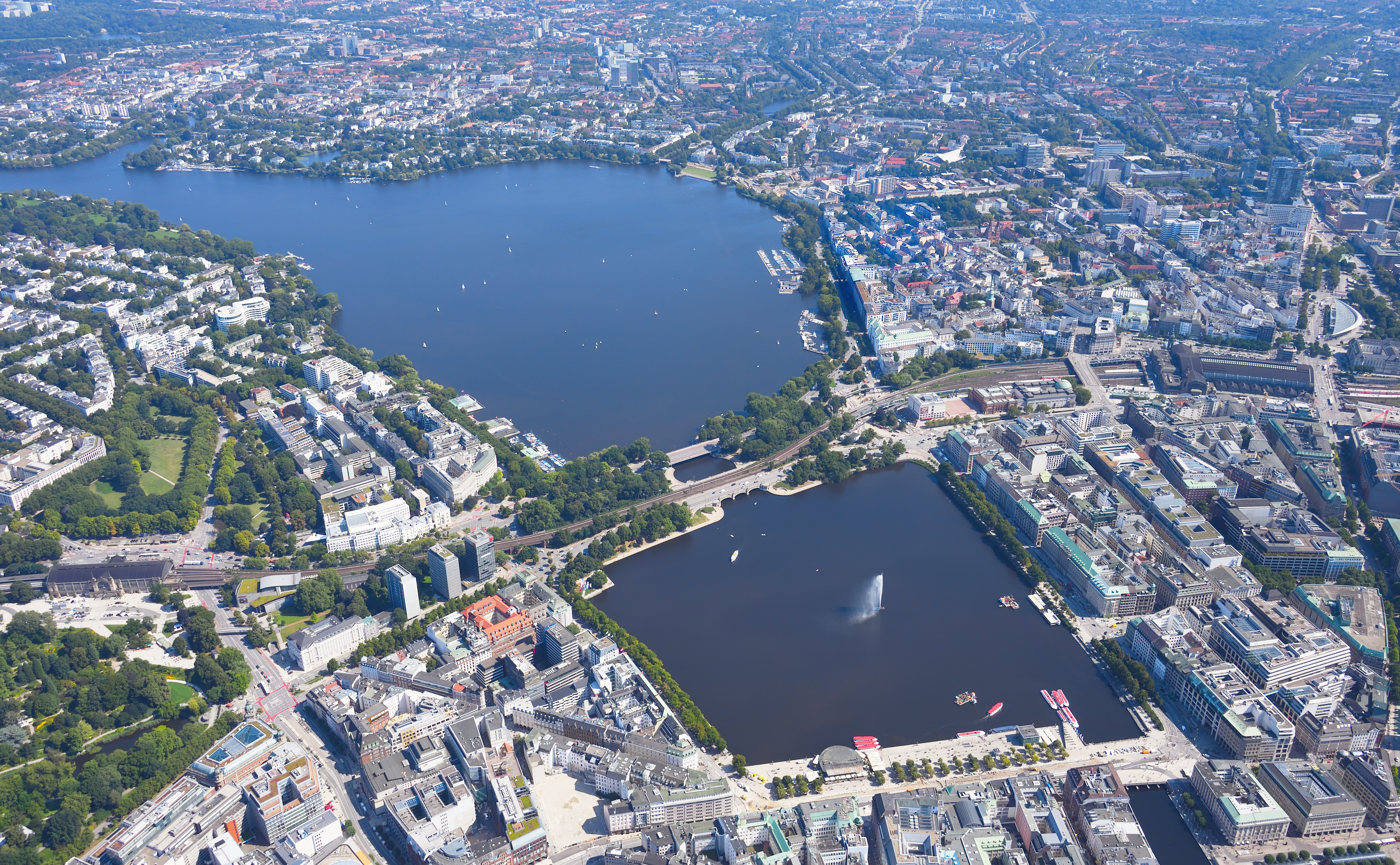
- Aerial view of the Alster's two lakes in Hamburg

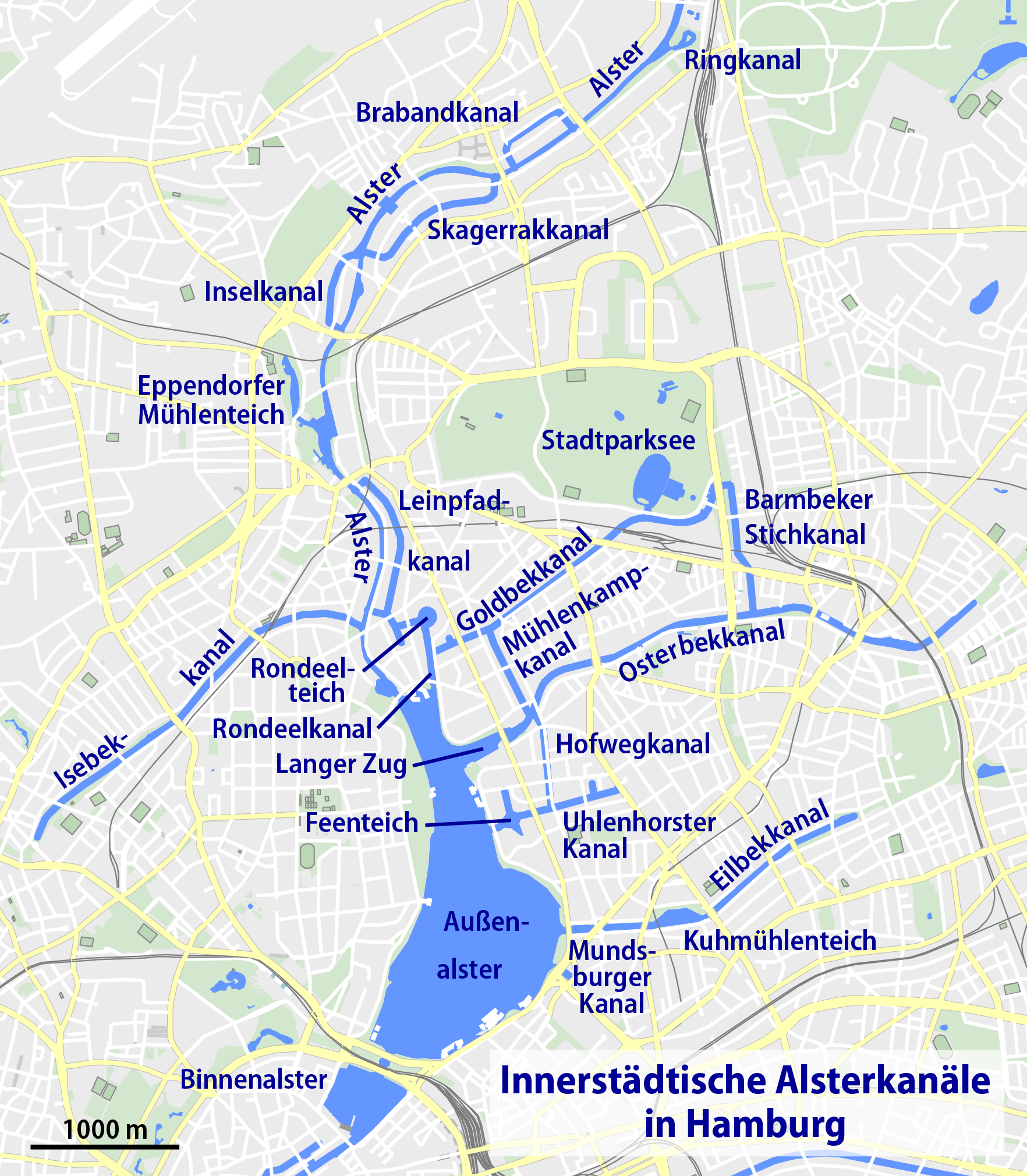
- Map of Alster and canals in Hamburg

Location
- Country: Germany
- States: Schleswig-Holstein; Hamburg

Physical characteristics
- Source
  - location: Henstedt-Ulzburg
  - coordinates: 53°45′49.1″N 10°0′17.4″E
  - elevation: 31 m (102 ft)
- Mouth: Elbe
  - location: Hamburg
  - coordinates: 53°32′40″N 9°59′0″E
  - elevation: 4 m (13 ft)
- Length: 56 km (35 mi)
- Discharge
  - average: 5.8 m^{3}/s (200 cu ft/s)

Basin features
- Tributaries
  - left: Bredenbek, Ammersbek, Saselbek, Osterbek, Wandse
  - right: Tarpenbek, Isebek
- Progression: Elbe→ North Sea

The Alster (German pronunciation: [ˈalstɐ]) is a river in Northern Germany, a right tributary of the Elbe. It has its source near Henstedt-Ulzburg, Schleswig-Holstein, flows somewhat southwards through much of the Free and Hanseatic City of Hamburg and joins the Elbe in central Hamburg.

The Alster is Hamburg's second most important river. While the Elbe river is a tidal navigation of international significance and prone to flooding, the Alster is a non-tidal, slow-flowing and in some places, seemingly untouched idyll of nature, in other places tamed and landscaped urban space. In the city center, the river forms two lakes, both prominent features in Hamburg's cityscape.

== Geography ==
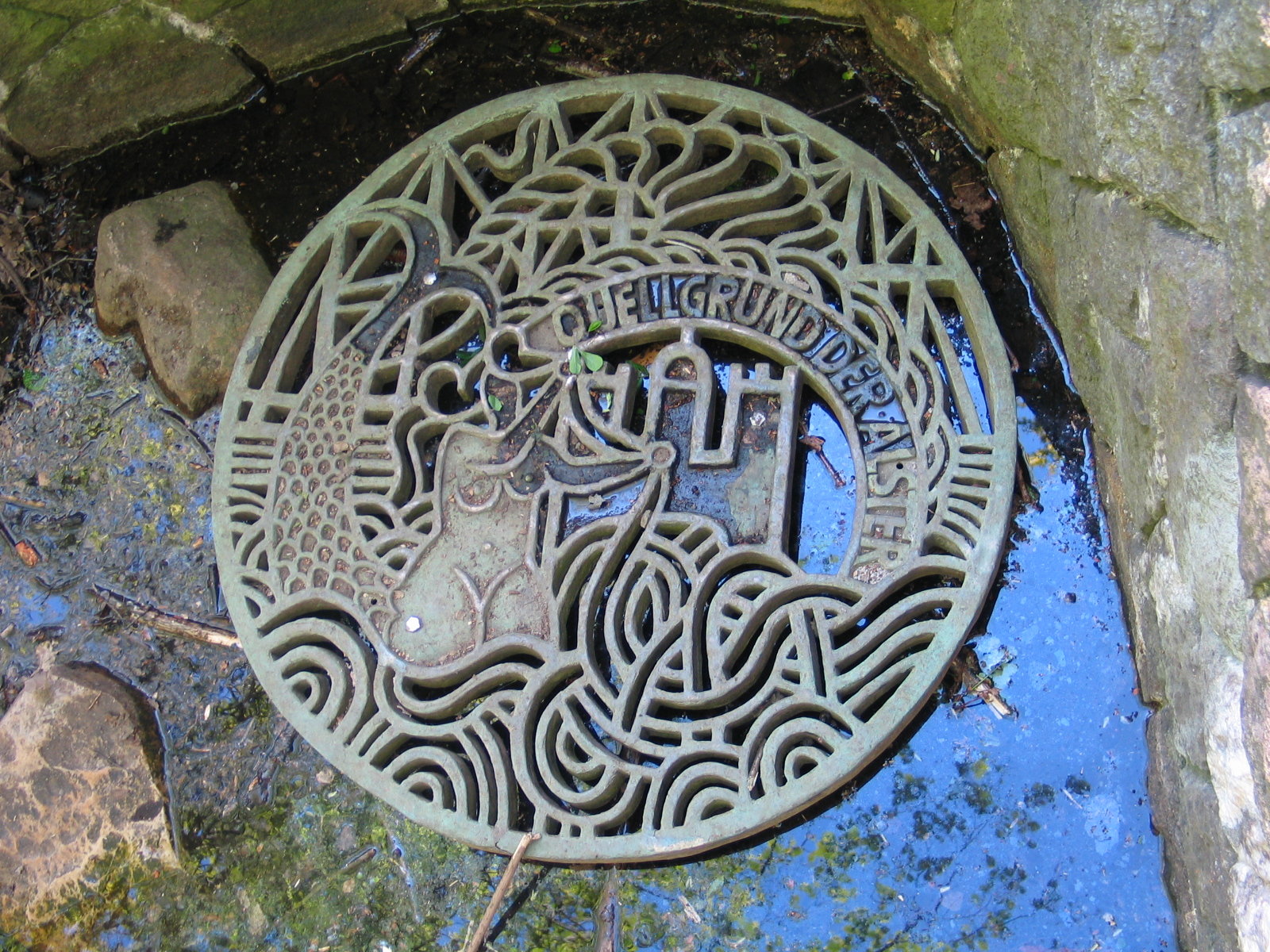
Iron plate at the Alster's source in Henstedt-Ulzburg

In total, the Alster is 56 km (35 mi) long and has an incline from 31 m to 4 m above sea level. Its drainage basin is about 587 km^{2} (227 sq mi). Left tributaries to the Alster are: Rönne, Alte Alster, Sielbek, Ammersbek, Drosselbek, Bredenbek, Rodenbek, Lohbek, Saselbek, Osterbek, and Wandse (Eilbek); right tributaries to the Alster are: Mühlenau (or Mühlenbach), Diekbek, Mellingbek, Susebek, Tarpenbek, and Isebek.

=== Upper course ===
The source of the Alster is a small bog pool in the Timhagen Brook near Henstedt-Ulzburg, approximately 25 km (16 mi) north of Hamburg. The small brook makes a couple of curves before entering Hamburg territory at Duvenstedt and Wohldorf-Ohlstedt. At that point, the Alster has passed a couple of smaller locks and has been passed by 15 bridges. From here on, Hamburgers use the river for water sports, especially for canoe and kayak trips on the river, or hikes along its shores. At Wellingsbüttel, the Alster runs past Wellingsbüttel Manor. At Ohlsdorf the Alster reaches a weir, approximately at the height of the former Fuhlsbüttel Lock, the last water level regulation before reaching the inner city. From Fuhlsbüttel downstream, the Alster's course, has been straightened on several locations, with old and new river beds occasionally forming parallel canal beds. Between city limits and the inner city's first lake − the Außenalster − the river is crossed by 42 bridges.

=== Lower course ===
For Hamburg's inner city, the river is a major geographical feature and greatly defines its cityscape. Through ponding of the river in the 13th century, two artificial lakes, the Außenalster (Outer Alster) and the smaller Binnenalster (Inner Alster) were created in central Hamburg. These two lakes and the surrounding parks serve as important recreational areas in the heart of the city. Binnenalster and the subsequent Kleine Alster form important urban spaces. The Alster's final section between Kleine Alster and its mouth at Binnenhafen, is called Alsterfleet, as part of a network of inner-city canals, including Bleichenfleet, Herrengrabenfleet, Mönkedammfleet, Neuerwallfleet and Nikolaifleet. Alsterfleet is regulated by two locks at Rathaus/Rathausmarkt and Baumwall, the latter protecting it from the Elbe tide.

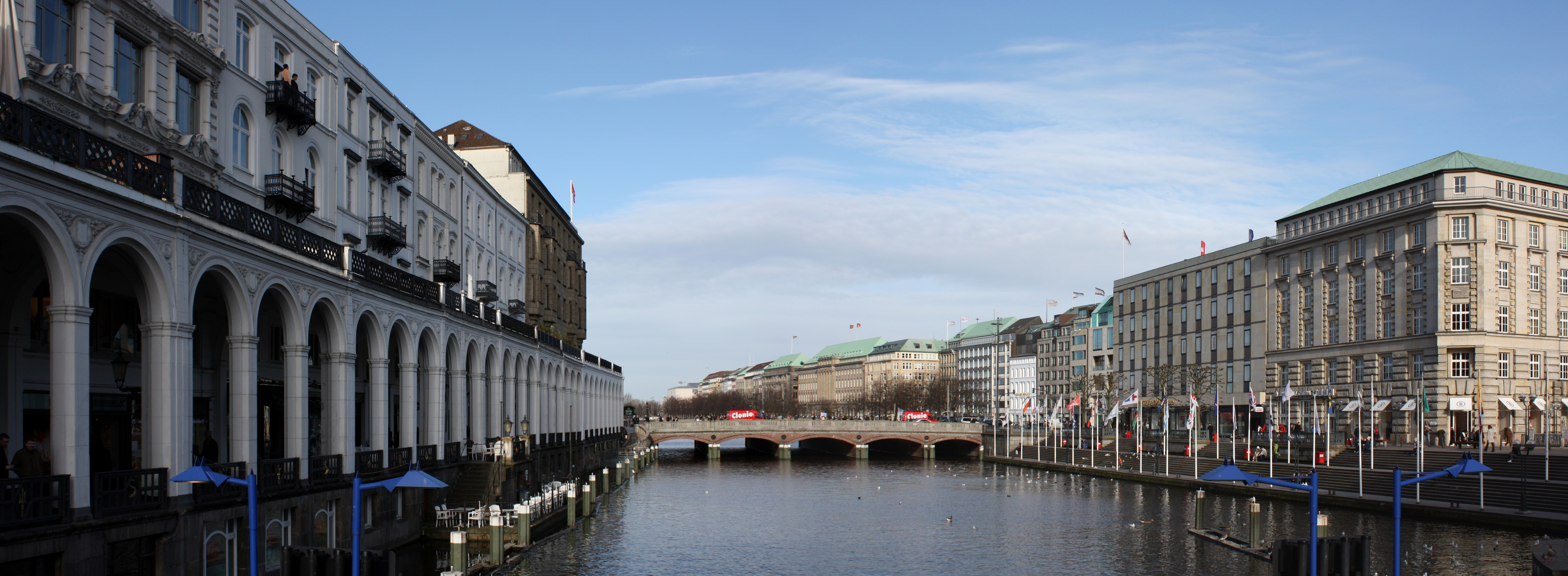
Panoramic view of Kleine Alster looking "upstream"; Alsterarkaden (left), Reesendammbrücke (center) and Rathausmarkt (far right)

== History ==
Hamburg was founded at the mouth of the Alster river in the 9th century and used it as a port. The water was used to flood the moats of the fortifications. The Alster has been dammed since 1190, originally to power a watermill. In 1235 a further dam was built for a second mill, which changed the shape of the river to be like a lake.

In the 15th and 16th century, an Alster canal was built to connect Hamburg with Lübeck. The canal was about 8 km (5.0 mi) long and built from the Alster to the Beste, a tributary of the Trave river, at Sülfeld. Because of the difficulties in holding water, especially near marsh areas, the 91 km (57 mi) long waterway from Hamburg to Lübeck was navigable from 1529 to 1550 only. Hamburg expanded along the shores of the Alster, and several locks were constructed to make the river navigable. Until the 19th century water transport with barges were used up to the town of Kayhude. The barges—transporting building material, fuel, and foods—were staked or hauled.

== Economy ==
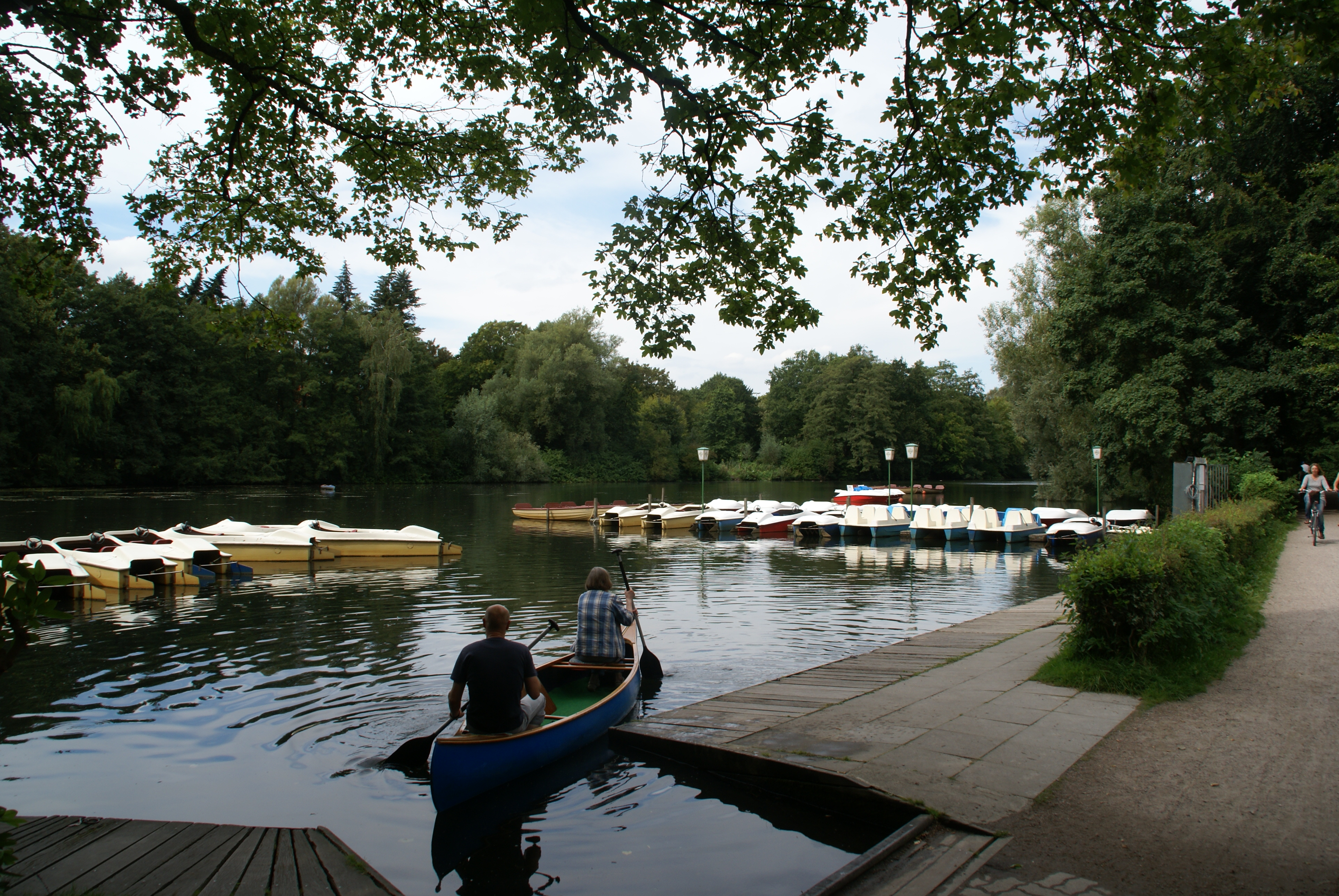
Paddleboats on the Alster near Rathsmühlendamm

The Alster is navigatable some 9 km upstream from the mouth. Alster Touristik GmbH (ATG), a subsidiary of the Hamburger Hochbahn, provides public and touristic transport on a fleet of Alster ferries in the city of Hamburg. Along the entire course within Hamburg, rowing or paddle boats are available for rent.

== Ecology ==
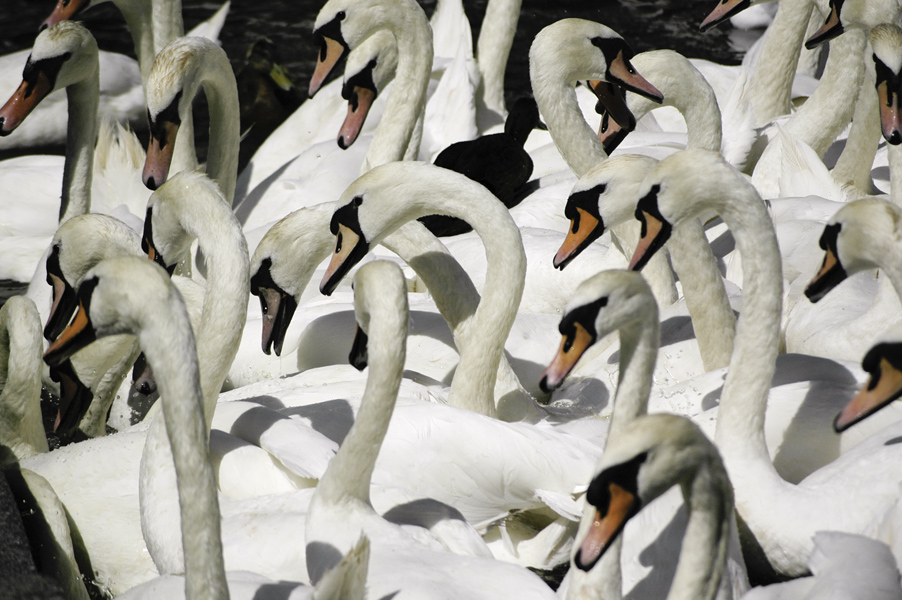
Hamburg's white Alster swans (Alsterschwäne) at Kleine Alster

Hamburg's Alster and its lakes and canals are famous for white swans, cared for out of public funds since the 16th century.

== Legacy ==
The Alster basin was an important model for the design of the Charles River basin, constructed in the early 20th century.

Throughout much of Germany, an Alsterwasser (literally: "Alster's water") is the name for a type of shandy, a concoction of equal parts of beer and lemonade. The river inspired the Hamburg-born composer Oscar Fetrás to compose the popular waltz "Mondnacht auf der Alster" (in English: "Moonlit Night on the Alster"). Hamburg's largest aquatic center, the Alsterschwimmhalle, is named after the river.

== See also ==
- List of rivers of Schleswig-Holstein
- List of rivers of Hamburg
- List of bridges in Hamburg

== Literature ==
Franklin Koplitzsch and Daniel Tilgner, ed. (2005). "Hamburg-Lexikon". Hamburg Lexikon (in German) (3 ed.). Ellert&Richter. ISBN 3-8319-0179-1.
