= List of bridges in Hamburg =

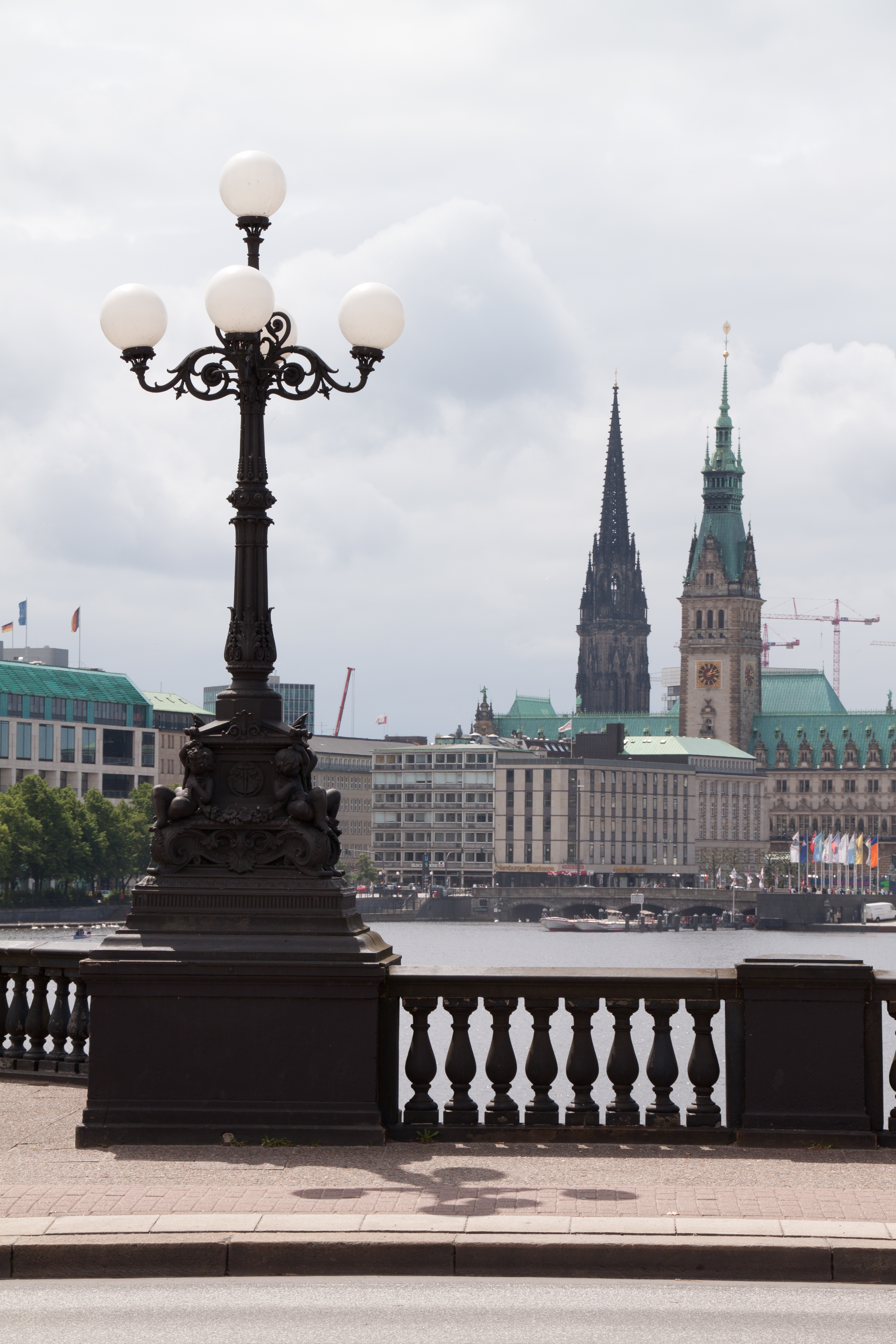
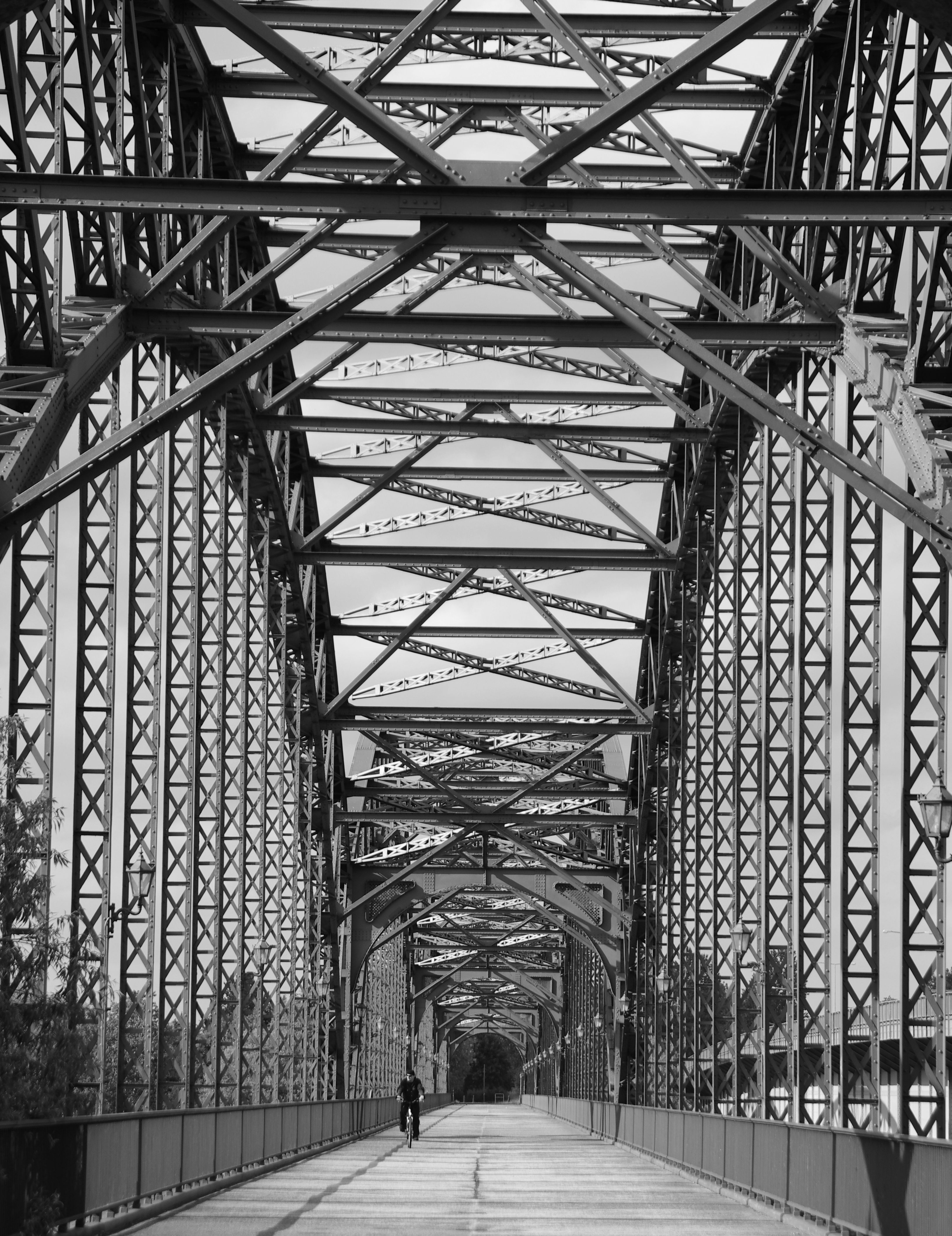
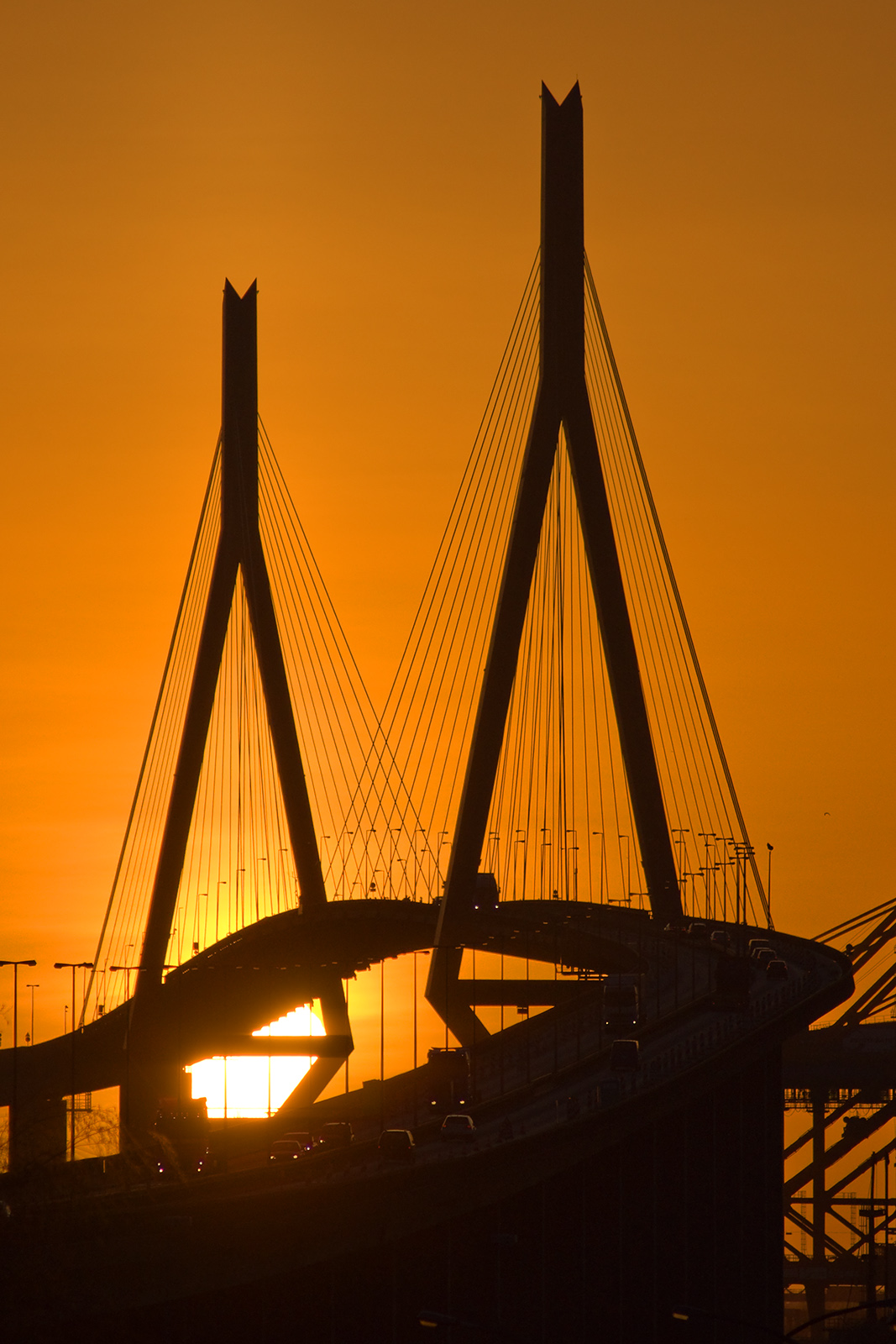
Three generations of bridges in Hamburg
From left to right: (1) Lombardsbrücke with the urban ensemble of the Binnenalster, (2) Alte Harburger Elbbrücke, one of many riveted truss bridges dating from the Industrial Age, (3) Köhlbrandbrücke, part of today's modern transport infrastructure.

This list of bridges in Hamburg is incomplete, with an overview of their history and geography. In this article, the bridges are listed by Hamburg's three major rivers (Alster, Bille and Elbe) and the respectively crossed body of water (river, creek, canal, fleet, harbor basin or else). The Elbe is by far the largest of the three. Unlike Alster and Bille, the Elbe is also within the North Sea's tidal influence, and Elbe bridges differ substantially from the ones on Alster and Bille. All three rivers are fed by a number of smaller rivers and also feature a number of branches or sidearms.

Hamburg has more than 2,500 bridges, the most bridges of any city in the world. Besides the Hanseatic city's mercantile and maritime history, the many rivers, canals and bridges lend to Hamburg's claim as the "Venice of the North". A 2004 report by the Department for Roads, Bridges and Waterways (LSBG) states a total number of 2,496 bridges in Hamburg, many more than cities like Venice, Amsterdam or Saint Petersburg. Given the city's waterborne geography and the port's heavy duty requirements, bridges in Hamburg also cover a great variety of architectural styles and innovative structural systems. Function-wise the total number of bridges break down to 1,172 road bridges, 987 railroad bridges (of which 407 Hochbahn bridges) and 470 footbridges (of which 290 within public parks and green spaces). 383 bridges are under management of the Hamburg Port Authority.

The most notable bridges in Hamburg include the historic inner-city bridges passing the Lower Alster (plus canals), the bridges across Speicherstadt canals, and the grand bridges spanning the Elbe's Norderelbe and Süderelbe anabranches, most commonly known as Elbbrücken.

== Bridges in the Alster river system ==
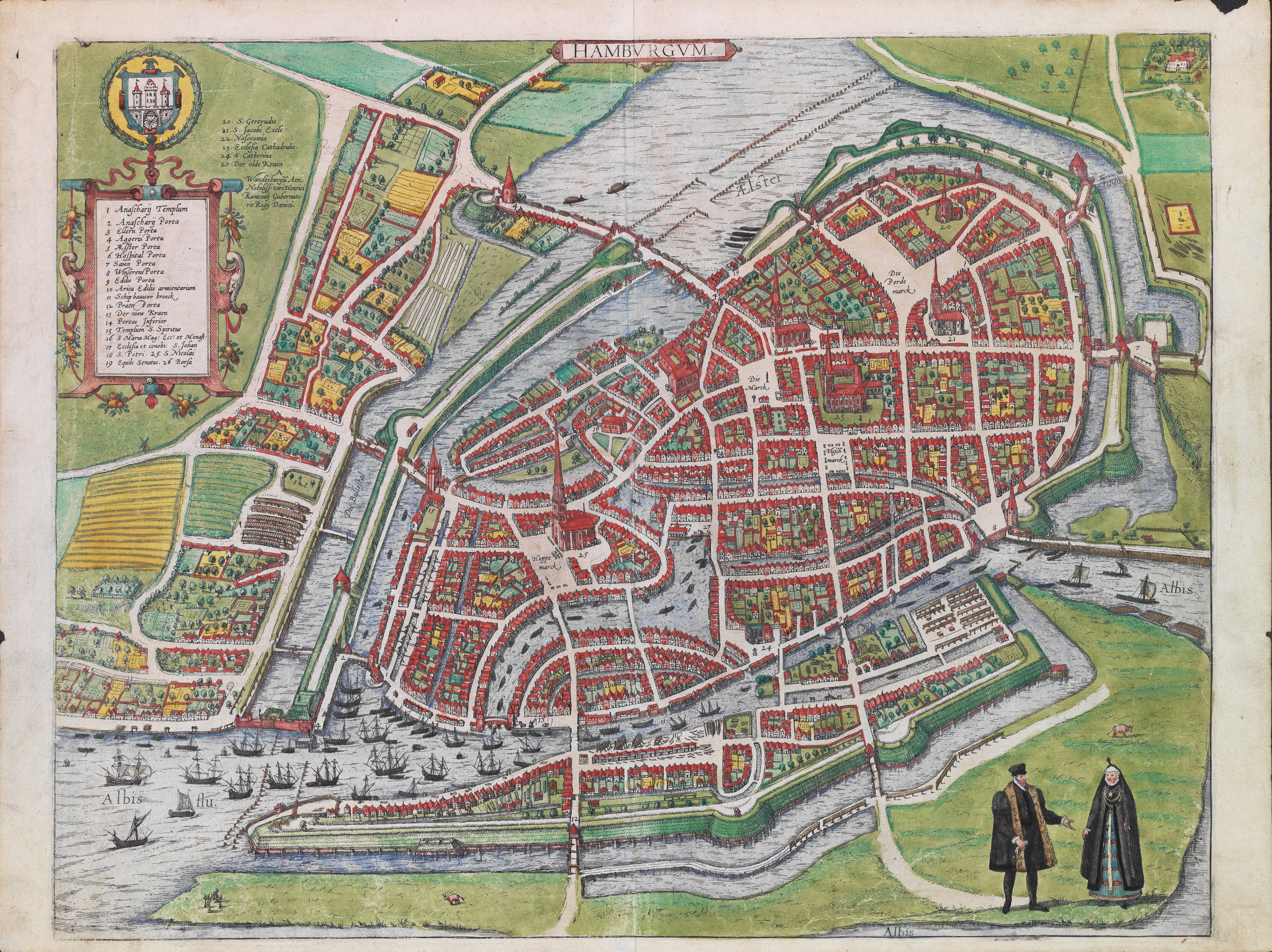
Map of Hamburg in 1589

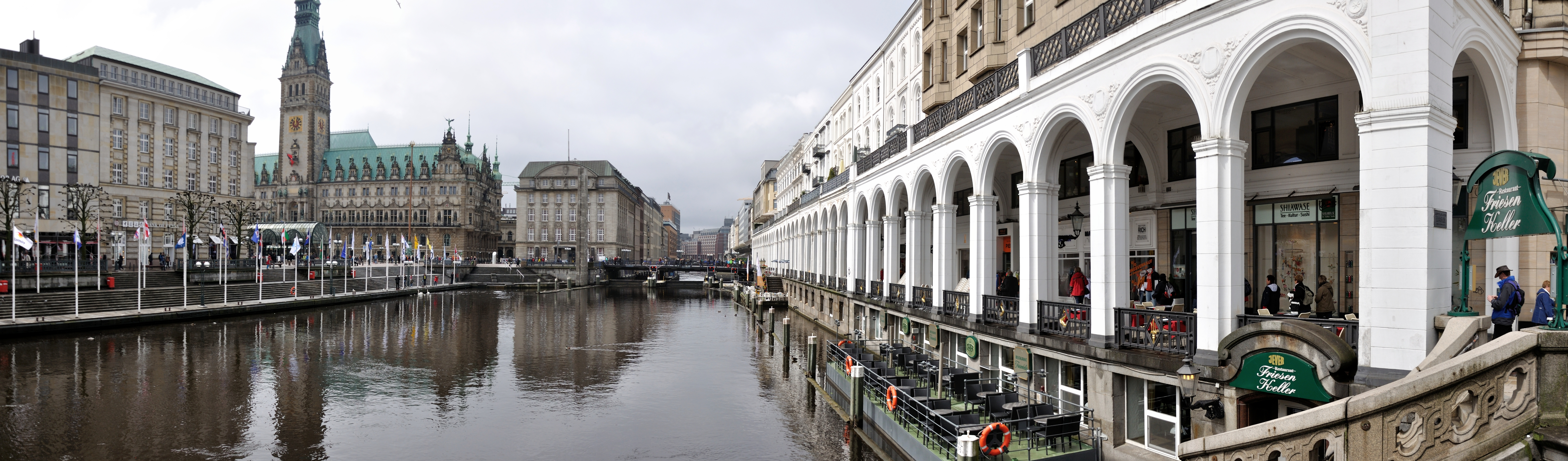
View of Kleine Alster basin from Reesendammbrücke; in the background: Rathaus (left) and Schleusenbrücke (center)

For centuries, the only bridges in Hamburg were across the Lower Alster and its canals in the Altstadt (old town). Repeated redirecting of the Alster canals resulted in ever new bridges to go with them. Ultimately, most of the pre-17th century bridges were destroyed in the Great Fire of 1842; the oldest remaining bridges in Hamburg are Zollenbrücke (1633) and Ellerntorsbrücke (1668).

Most of today's bridges in the inner city date from the 1840s reconstruction, during which over two dozen, mainly Renaissance Revival stone arch bridges were erected under then building director Johann Hermann Maack (1809–1868). Maack's bridges tied into a general urban redevelopment of the inner city which was similarly seen in a number of European cities of the mid 19th century, and still characterizes many of the Neustadt's canals.

Most of the bridges across the Upper Alster and adjoining canals were first built in conjunction with the area's extensive residential developments from the 1860s onwards. Some of them were gradually replaced during the 1920s, with Fritz Schumacher in particular establishing a brick-arch-prototype for many bridges.

=== Alster ===
Bridges across the Alster (Alsterbrücken) in Hamburg; some 31 km (19 mi) of the Alster's total of 56 km (35 mi) lie within Hamburg.

==== Upper Alster ====
A great number of the city's Alster bridges are located in the residential districts along the Upper Alster and its tributaries and accompanying side canals.

Image	Name	Built	Length	Location	Notes
	↓ Alster (Hamburg state border)				
	Ratsmühlendammbrücke	1991		Fuhlsbüttel, Ohlsdorf	
	Hasenbergbrücke	1913		Ohlsdorf	
	Sengelmannbrücke	1919 (2001)	36 m (118 ft)	Alsterdorf	
	Hindenburgbrücke	1920		Alsterdorf	
	Dammbrücke	1918		Alsterdorf	
	Metzgerbrücke			Alsterdorf	
	Deelbögebrücke			Alsterdorf	
	Bahnbrücke	1941		Alsterdorf	carries the Hamburg freight rail bypass
	Meenkbrücke			Eppendorf, Winterhude	
	Fährhausbrücke			Eppendorf, Winterhude	
	↓ Eppendorfer Mühlenteich				
	Hudtwalckerbrücke	1921	72 m (236 ft)	Eppendorf, Winterhude	carries Hudtwalckerstraße, part of Bundesstraße 5
	U1 Hochbahn Viaduct	1912		Eppendorf, Winterhude	carries Hamburg U-Bahn line
	U3 Hochbahn Viaduct	1912		Eppendorf, Winterhude	carries Hamburg U-Bahn line (Circle line)
	Goernebrücke	1909	72 m (236 ft)	Eppendorf, Winterhude	
	Streekbrücke; 53°35′1″N 9°59′43″E	1913 (1927)	40 m (130 ft)	Harvestehude, Winterhude	
	Krugkoppelbrücke; 53°34′48″N 9°59′58″E	1890 (1928)	72 m (236 ft)	Harvestehude, Winterhude	designed by Fritz Schumacher
	↓ Außenalster				

- For bridges from the Außenalster downstream, see #Lower Alster

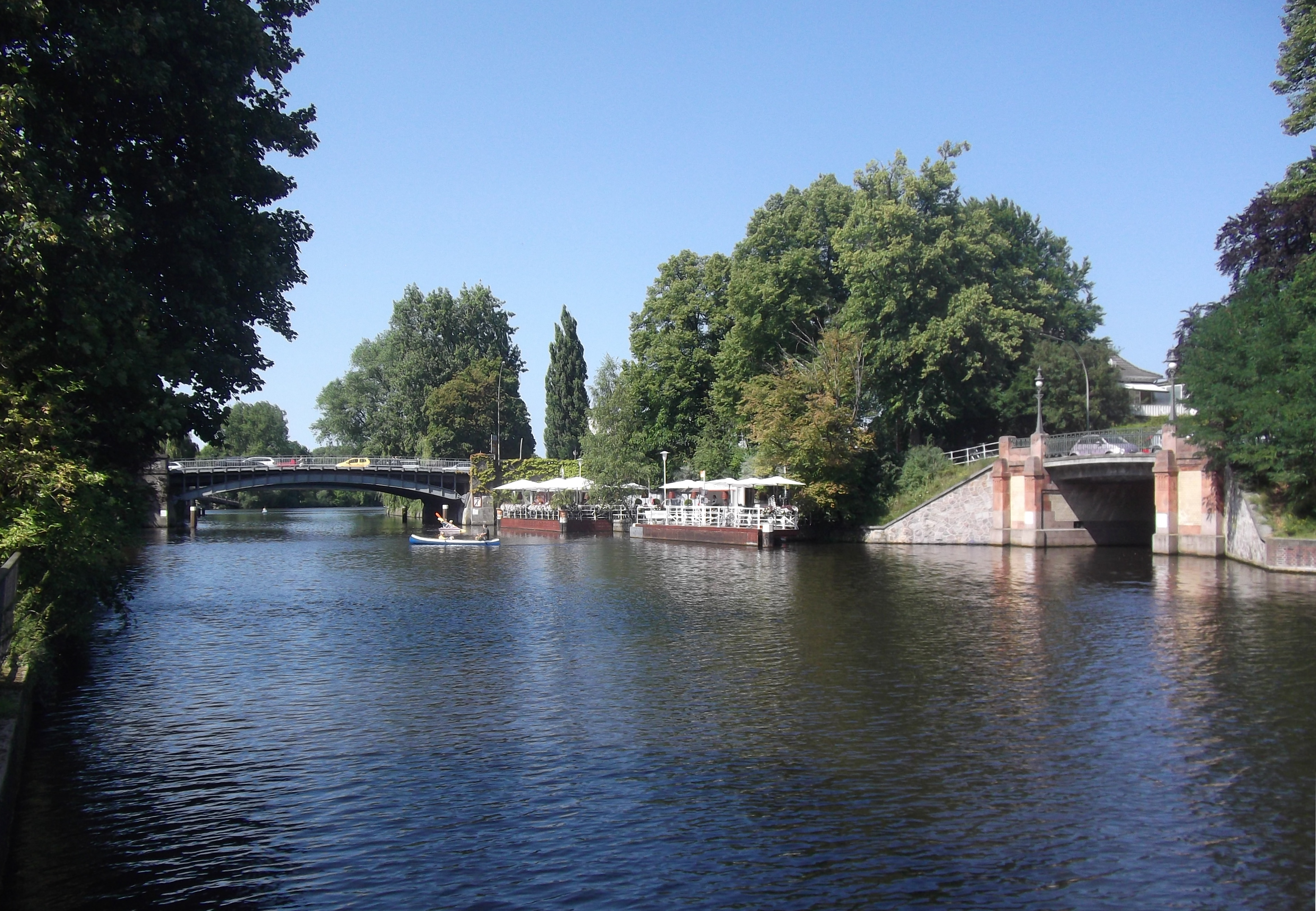
The Alster with Winterhuder Brücke (left) and Leinpfadbrücke (right).

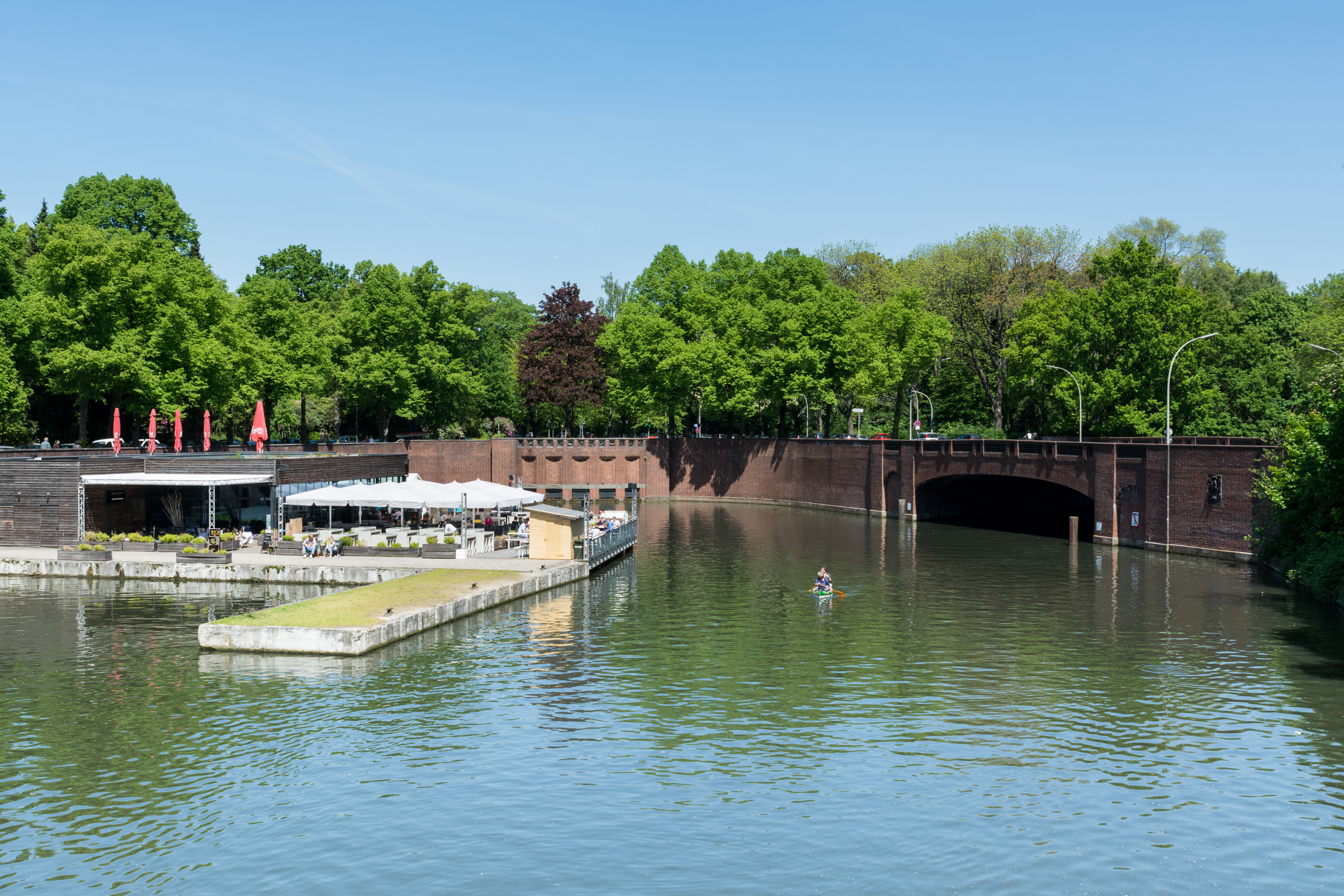
View from Stadthallenbrücke: the Stadtparkhafen with Saarlandbrücke (right).

Map of the Außenalster and its joining rivers and canals. The Isebekkanal joins the Alster prior to its mouth into the Außenalster (top left corner), the Goldbekkanal joins the lake through Rondelkanal (top center). Rivers and canals joining from the left are: Osterbekkanal at Langer Zug, and Mundsburger Kanal at the Außenalster's greatest width.

The Alster is joined by the Tarpenbek at Eppendorfer Mühlenteich on its right side; a little further downstream, the Leinpfadkanal branches off the Alster's left side and creates a water link with a number of canals, including the Goldbekkanal, which in turn feeds into the Alster's system at Außenalster. Again on the right ride, the Isebekkanal joins the Alster's water shortly before reaching the Außenalster.

Tarpenbek

Bridges across Tarpenbek; the Tarpenbek empties into the Alster at Eppendorfer Mühlenteich.

- Roosenbrookbrücke
- Bahnbrücke
- Borsteler Brücke
- Anni-Glissmann-Brücke

Leinpfadkanal

Bridges across Leinpfadkanal; the Leinpfadkanal runs parallel to the Alster.

- Leinpfadbrücke (1907)
- Klärchenbrücke (1909)
- Maria-Louisen-Brücke
- Werftbrücke
- Blumenstraßenbrücke

Isebekanal

Bridges across Isebek and Isebekkanal

- Eimsbütteler Brücke (1909)
- Goebenbrücke
- Mansteinbrücke
- Hoheluftbrücke
- Klosteralleebrücke (1906)
- Eppendorfer Brücke (1927)
- Hochbahn Viaduct (1910)
- Isebrücke (1900)
- Heilwigbrücke

Goldbekkanal

Bridges across Barmbeker Stichkanal, Goldbekkanal, Mühlenkampkanal and Rondelkanal

- Stichkanalbrücke
- Hellbrookstraßenbrücke
- Saarlandbrücke
- Stadthallenbrücke
- Schleidenbrücke (1925)
- Wiesendammbrücke (1930)
- Moorfuhrtbrücke (1912)
- Poelchaukampbrücke (1895)
- Fernsichtbrücke (1928)

==== Lower Alster ====
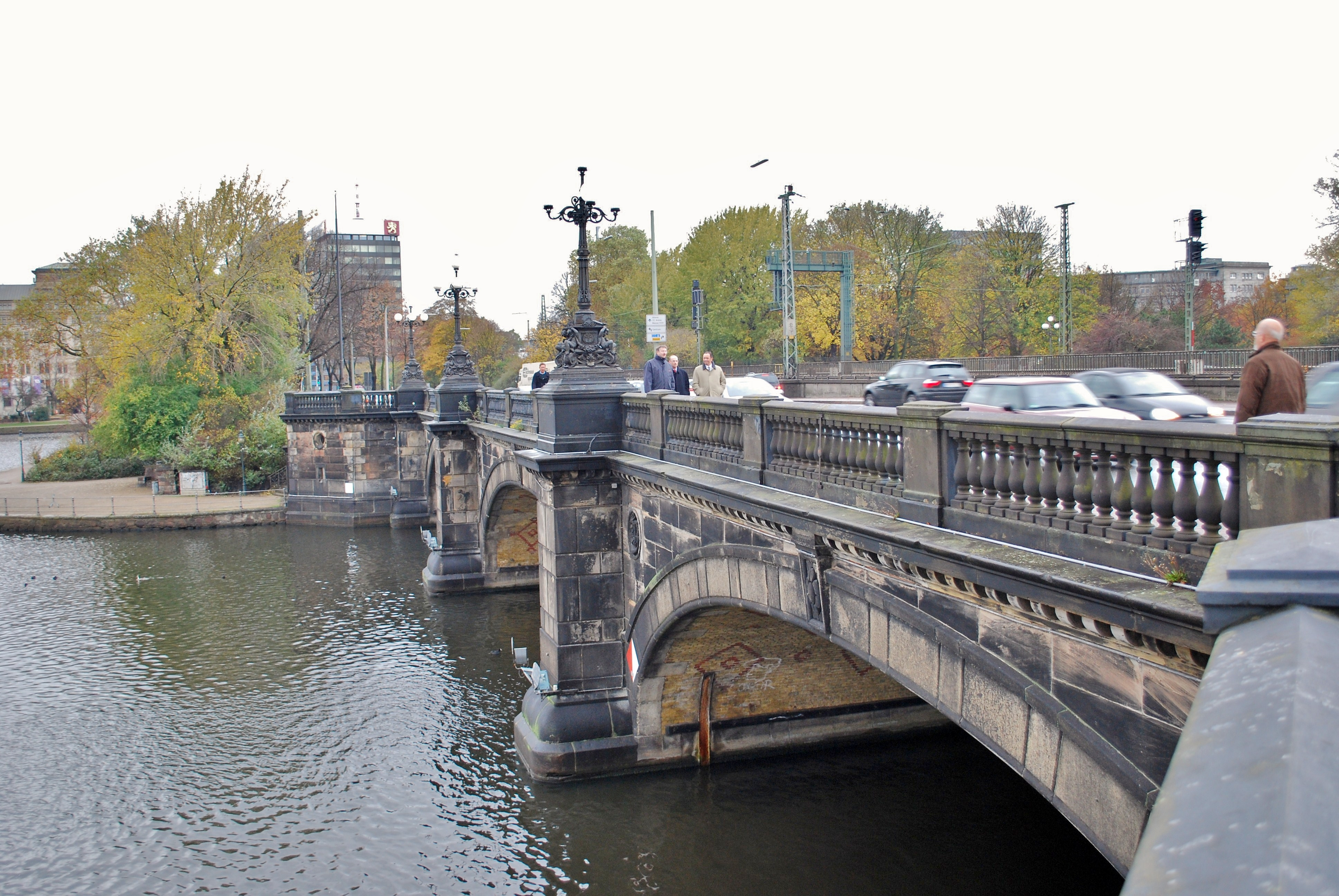
The Lombardsbrücke is one of only two bridges between the two Alster lakes; it is the inner city's most frequented bridge, with an average of 67,000 cars and 1,000 trains per day.

Bridges across the Lower Alster (from the Außenalster downstream); this section lists most bridges in the inner city districts Altstadt and Neustadt.

Image	Name	Built	Length	Location	Notes
	↓ Außenalster				
	Kennedybrücke; 53°33′28″N 9°59′53″E	1953	126 m (413 ft)	Rotherbaum, St. Georg	designed by Bernhard Hermkes; originally named Neue Lombardsbrücke (until 1963)
	Lombardsbrücke; 53°33′25″N 9°59′50″E	1651 (1868)	69 m (226 ft)	Neustadt, Altstadt	designed by Johann Hermann Maack; part of the Wallring, also carries the Hamburg-Altona link line
	↓ Binnenalster				
	Reesendammbrücke; 53°33′7″N 9°59′39″E	1844	47 m (154 ft)	Neustadt, Altstadt	designed by Johann Hermann Maack, carries the Jungfernstieg
	↓ Kleine Alster				
	Schleusenbrücke	1870		Neustadt, Altstadt	
	↓ Alster continues as Alsterfleet				
	Adolphsbrücke	1845	36 m (118 ft)	Neustadt, Altstadt	designed by Johann Hermann Maack, replaced the Scheelengangsbrücke
	Heiligengeistbrücke	1885	51 m (167 ft)	Neustadt, Altstadt	
	Slamatjenbrücke	1959		Neustadt, Altstadt	
	Binnenhafenbrücke			Neustadt, Altstadt	
	Otto-Sill-Brücke			Neustadt, Altstadt	
	↓ Norderelbe at Binnenhafen				

- For bridges across Binnenhafen, see #Oberhafen, Zollkanal and Binnenhafen

Bleichenfleet and Herrengrabenfleet

Bridges across Bleichenfleet and Herrengrabenfleet in Neustadt

Image	Name	Built	Length
	↓ Alsterfleet		
	Bleichenbrücke	1845	
	Stadthausbrücke		
	Ellerntorsbrücke	1668	36.2 m (119 ft)
	Michaelisbrücke	(1988)	
	Herrengrabenbrücke		
	Pulverturmbrücke		
	Schaartorbrücke	1868	
	↓ Norderelbe at Niederhafen		

Mönkedammfleet and Nikolaifleet

Bridges across Mönkedammfleet and Nikolaifleet in Altstadt

Image	Name	Built	Length
	↓ Alsterfleet		
	Altenwallbrücke		
	Mühlenbrücke		
	Trostbrücke	1266 (1883)	21 m (69 ft)
	Zollenbrücke	1355 (1633)	25 m (82 ft)
	Nikolaibrücke		
	Holzbrücke	1847	48 m (157 ft)
	Hohe Brücke	1887	
	↓ Norderelbe at Zollkanal		

- For bridges across Zollkanal, see #Oberhafen, Zollkanal and Binnenhafen

=== Osterbek ===
Bridges across Osterbek and Osterbekkanal

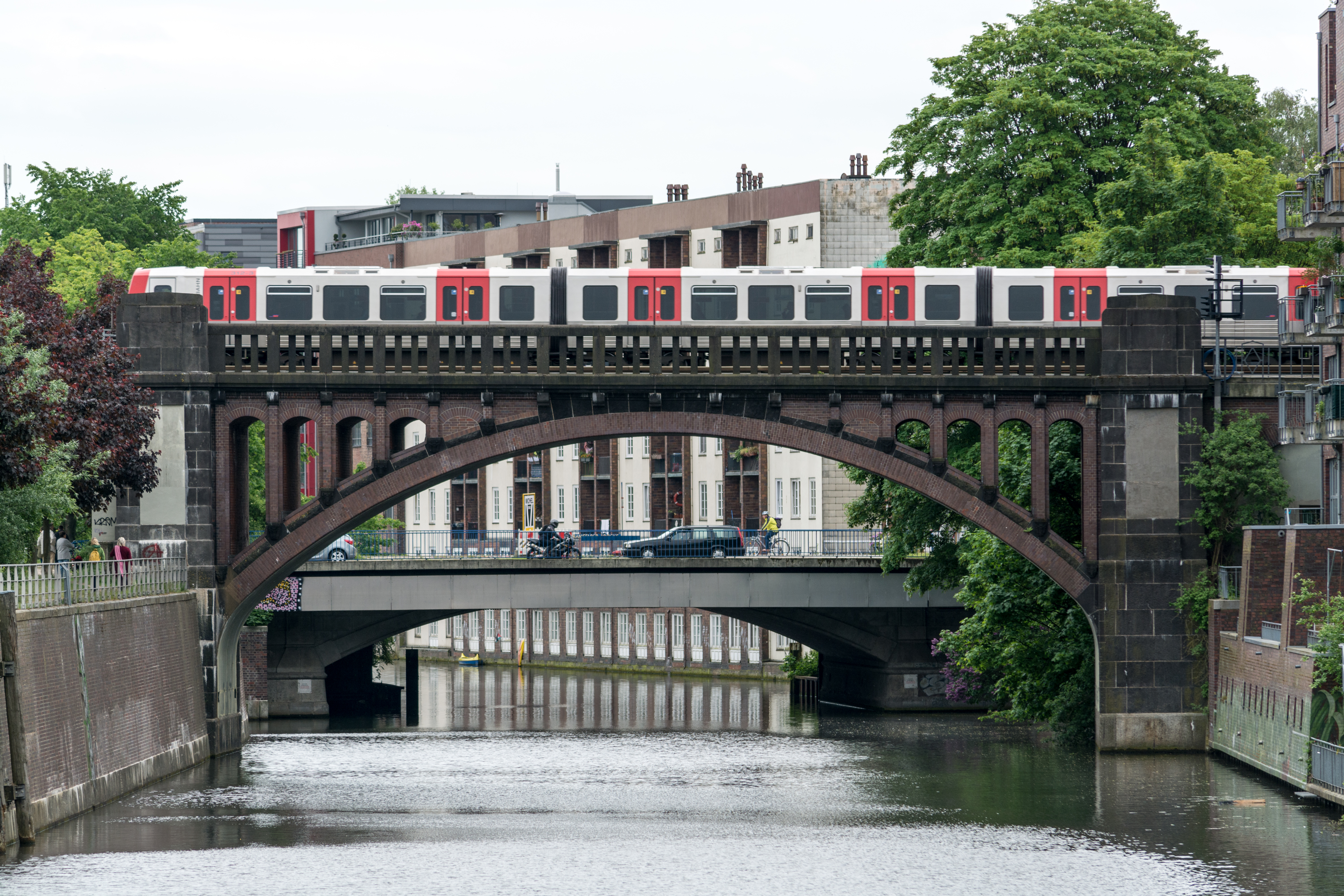
Bramfelder Brücke (background) and the U3 Hochbahn Viaduct

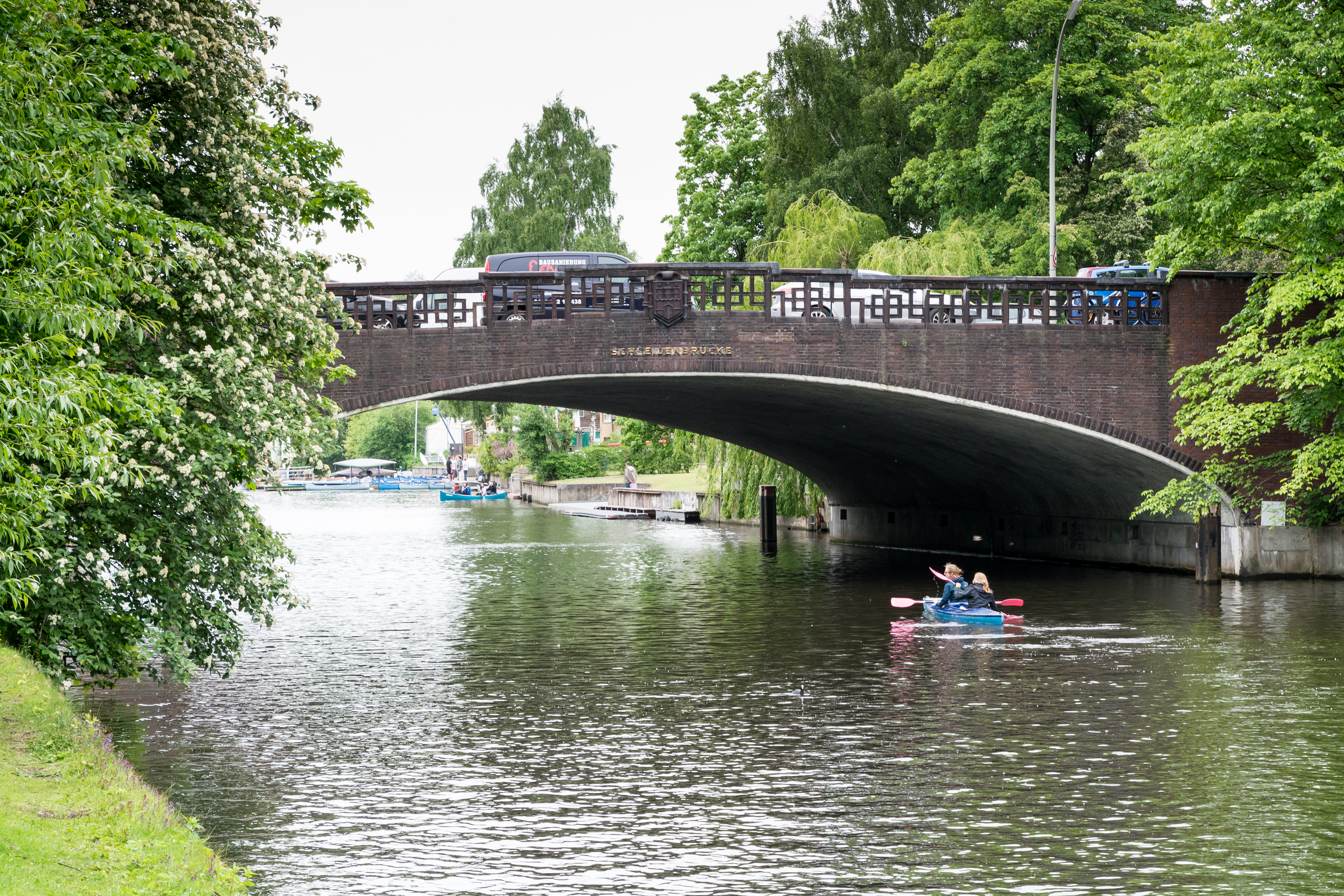
Schleidenbrücke

- Bramfelder Brücke (1900)
- U3 Osterbekkanal Hochbahn Viaduct (1912)
- Hufnerstraßenbrücke
- Käthnerortbrücke
- Schleidenbrücke
- Großheidesteg
- Heinz-Gärtner-Brücke
- Mühlenkampbrücke (1900)
- Langenzugbrücke (1864, 1909)
- For bridges from the Außenalster downstream, see [[#Lower Alster|]]

=== Uhlenhorster Kanal ===
Bridges across Hofwegkanal and Uhlenhorster Kanal

- Grillparzerbrücke
- Fährbrücke
- Hofwegbrücke (1894)
- Herbert-Weichmann-Brücke (1893)
- Feenteichbrücke (1884)
- For bridges from the Außenalster downstream, see #Lower Alster

=== Wandse ===
Bridges across Wandse, Eilbek, Eilbekkanal and Mundsburger Kanal

Image	Name	Built	Length	Location	Notes
	↓ Wandse (Hamburg state border)				
	Wandsbeker Königstraßenbrücke			Wandsbek	
	↓ Mühlenteich				
	Mühlenstraßenbrücke			Wandsbek	
	Bahnbrücke			Eilbek, Barmbek-Süd	carries the Hamburg freight rail bypass
	↓ Wandse continues as Eilbek				
	Eilbecker Brücke			Eilbek, Barmbek-Süd	
	Friedrichsberger Brücke			Eilbek, Barmbek-Süd	
	Maxstraßenbrücke	1908		Eilbek, Barmbek-Süd	
	↓ Wandse continues as Eilbekkanal				
	Von-Essen-Straßenbrücke			Eilbek, Barmbek-Süd	
	Wagnerstraßenbrücke			Eilbek, Barmbek-Süd	
	Richardstraßenbrücke	1899		Eilbek, Barmbek-Süd	
	Wartenaubrücke	1908		Hohenfelde, Uhlenhorst	carries Wartenau, part of Bundesstraße 5
	↓ Kuhmühlenteich				
	Kuhmühlenteichbrücke	1912	65 m (213 ft)	Hohenfelde, Uhlenhorst	carries Hamburg U-Bahn line (Circle line)
	↓ Wandse continues as Mundsburger Kanal				
	Kuhmühlenbrücke	1870 (1967)		Hohenfelde, Uhlenhorst	
	Mundsburger Brücke	1870	59.3 m (195 ft)	Hohenfelde, Uhlenhorst	designed by Christian Wilhelm Plath and William Lindley
	Schwanenwikbrücke; 53°33′56″N 10°1′1″E	1878	55 m (180 ft)	Hohenfelde, Uhlenhorst	designed by Franz Andreas Meyer
	↓ Außenalster				

- For bridges from the Außenalster downstream, see #Lower Alster

== Bridges in the Bille river system ==
=== Bille ===
Bridges across the Bille in Hamburg; 23 km (14 mi) of the Bille's total of 65 km (40 mi) lie within Hamburg.

Image	Name	Built	Length	Location	Notes
	↓ Bille (Hamburg state border)				
	Ernst-Mantius-Brücke			Bergedorf	
	↓ Schlossteich				
	Sehrrahnbrücke			Bergedorf	
	↓ Sehrrahn				
	Bergedorfer Brücke			Bergedorf	carries Bergedorfer Straße, part of Bundesstraße 5
	Ladenbeker-Furtweg-Brücke			Bergedorf	
	Bojewiesenbrücke			Bergedorf	
	Rote Brücke			Billbrook	
	Gelbe Brücke			Billstedt, Billbrook	
	Blaue Brücke			Horn, Billbrook	
	Braune Brücke			Hamm, Rothenburgsort	
	Grüne Brücke	1911		Hammerbrook, Rothenburgsort	
	Schwarze Brücke	1909		Hammerbrook, Rothenburgsort	carries Heidenkampsweg, part of Bundesstraße 75
	Zweite Amsinckbrücke			Hammerbrook, Rothenburgsort	carries Amsinckstraße, part of Bundesstraße 4
	↓ Norderelbe at Oberhafen				

- For bridges across Oberhafen, see #Oberhafen, Zollkanal and Binnenhafen

=== Hammerbrook canals ===
Bridges across Hammerbrook and Rothenburgsort canals

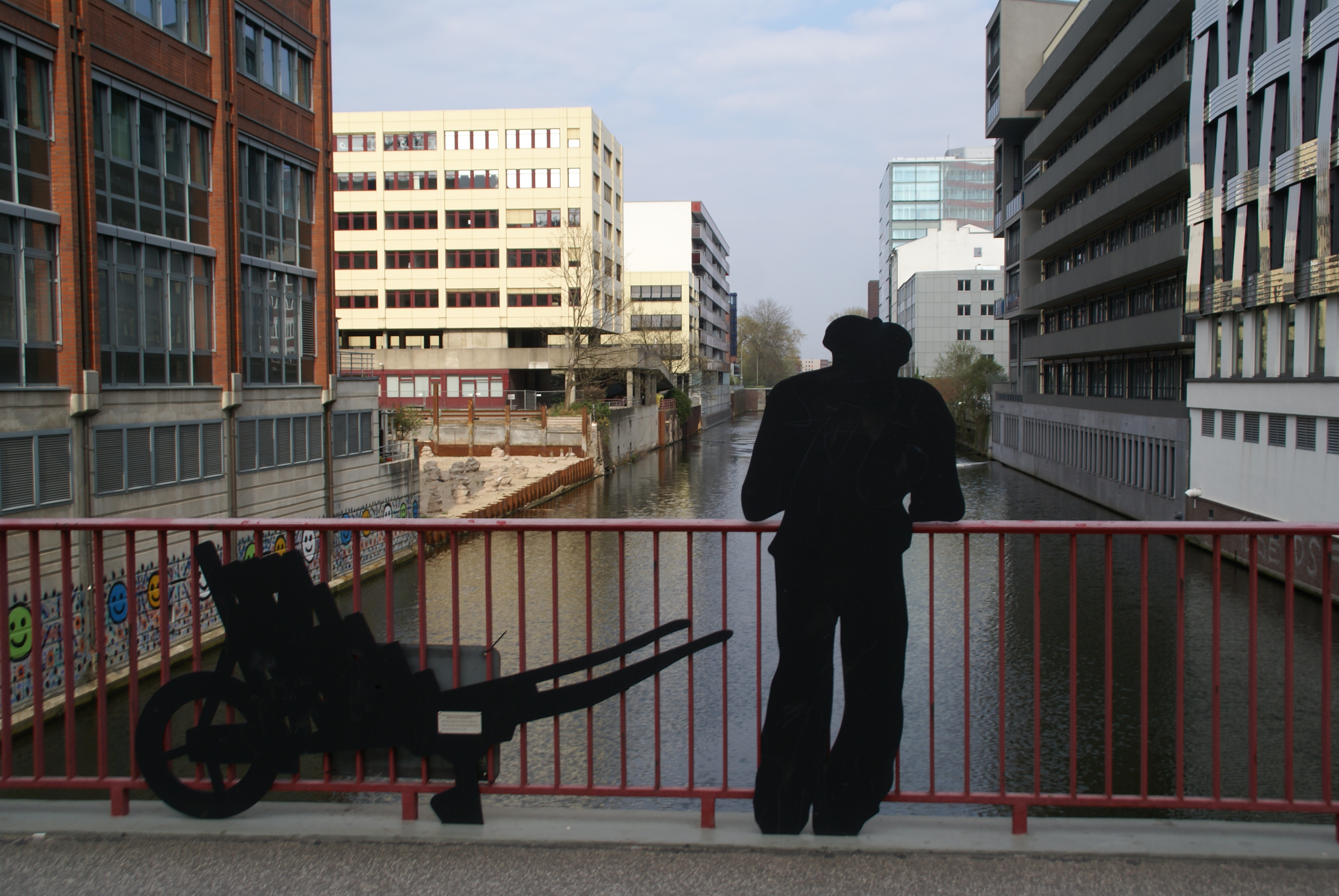
View of Mittelkanal (sculpture on Zweite Hammerbrookbrücke)

- Billekanal
  - Schurzalleebrücke
  - Gustav-Kunst-Brücke
- Hochwasserbassin
  - Wendenbrücke
  - Süderstraßenbrücke (1908)
  - Bullerdeichbrücke
- Mittelkanal
  - Zweite Banksbrücke
  - Erste Nagelsbrücke
  - Zweite Nagelsbrücke
  - S-Bahn Viaduct
  - Zweite Hammerbrookbrücke
  - Zweite Heidenkampbrücke
- Schleusenkanal
  - Erste Stadtdeichbrücke
  - Erste Banksbrücke
  - Erste Amsinckbrücke
- Sonninkanal
  - Mittelkanalbrücke
- Südkanal
  - Zweite Ausschläger Brücke
  - Zweite Grevenbrücke
- Tiefstackkanal
  - Liebigbrücke
  - Borsigbrücke
  - Tiefstacker Brücke

== Bridges in the Elbe river system ==
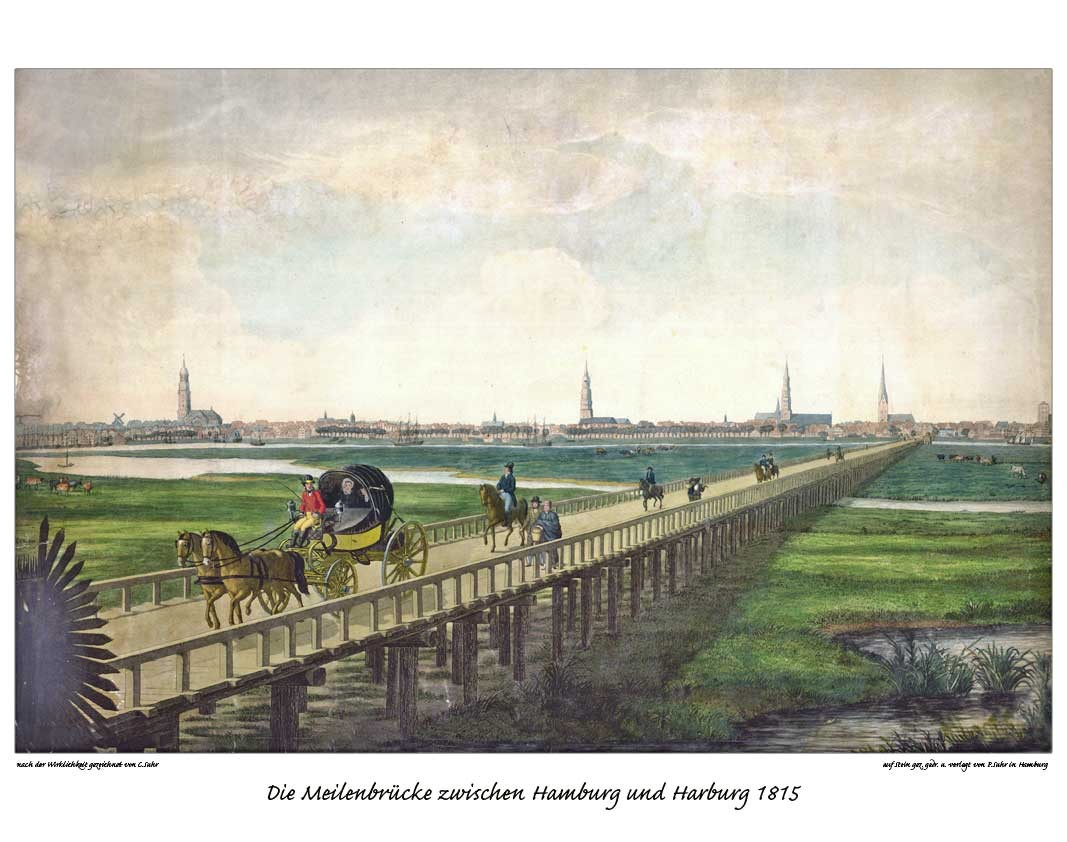
View of the 1810s pile bridge

Up until the 19th century, the Unterelbe had no fixed crossing. Travel time between Hamburg and Harburg took over two hours, and included two ferry trips across the Norder- and Süderelbe and a weary trip across the dikes of Wilhelmsburg. During Napoleon's brief annexion of Hamburg, a 4 kilometers (2.5 miles) long pile bridge was built across the islands of Wilhelmsburg, however it also required cable ferries across the Elbe's two anabranches. In 1817 the poorly maintained structure was washed away.

By the 1840s, with industrialization rapidly growing and trade through the Port of Hamburg skyrocketing, the need for a fixed crossing became apparent. At the time, the German states were a loose confederation of sovereign states, with the Free and Hanseatic City of Hamburg only controlling the northern Elbe shore, while the town of Harburg and the southern Elbe shore were part of the Kingdom of Hanover. Both sides built their railway lines: Hamburg–Bergedorf railway in 1842 (extended to Berlin in 1846), and Celle–Harburg railway in 1847 (connected to Hanover since 1845) – but no link across the Elbe. One of the biggest obstacles was Hanover's rivalry to Hamburg and her attempts to promote overseas trade through the Port of Harburg.

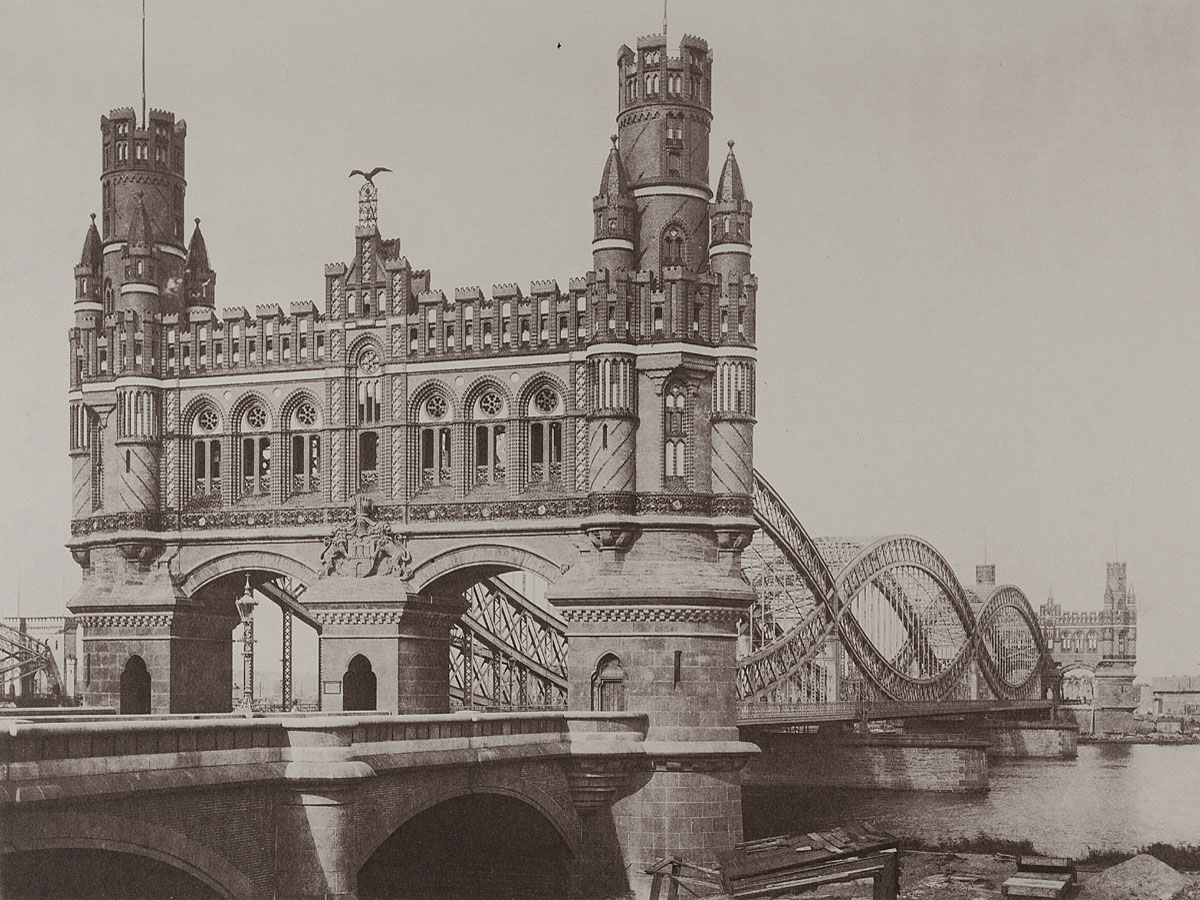
Neue Elbbrücke (1887). The Gothic Revival gateways were removed in 1959.

Twenty years on, the missing link became a void in the European rail network. Progress was finally possible after Prussia's annexation of Hanover in 1866; within a few years the Cologne-Minden Railway Company (CME) completed the Venlo–Hamburg railway as North German section of a Paris–Hamburg railway line, and thereby linking Hamburg with the industrial centers of the Rhineland and the Low Countries. The first railway bridges across Norder- and Süderelbe were built between 1869 and 1872, nowadays part of the Elbbrücken. Also starting in 1866, the port's infrastructure was substantially re-organized, in order to cope with the increased quantity of processed goods and to meet requirements of then commonly employed steam-powered vessels. This included an expansion of the port onto the islands of Steinwerder, Veddel and Wilhelmsburg, and set-up of an extensive rail network for the newly established Hamburg port railway (Hafenbahn). In 1887, the Neue Elbbrücke with its three lenticular trusses (each 102 meters long) became a Hamburg landmark and the first road bridge to cross the Norderelbe, serving many of the port's businesses. By 1899, the Alte Harburger Elbbrücke provided a road link across the Süderelbe.

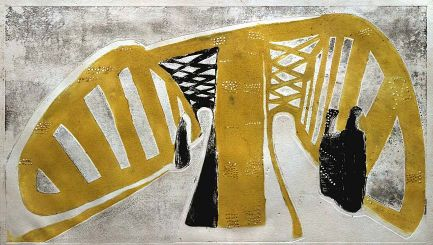
Elbe Bridge I from the series Hamburg Bridges (1932) by Rolf Nesch

New bridges across the Elbe anabranches and the Elbe islands' canals were and are continued to be built to this day. Over the years, some of them have set new standards or records in engineering. With the Elbe bridges being perceived as a symbol of the many changes associated with the Industrial Age, they were continuously subject to artistic and intellectual reception, among others by artists of the Hamburg Secession (Sezession) during the interwar period, or latest by the Internationale Bauausstellung during the 2000s. In 2015, the Speicherstadt was acknowledged as a World Heritage Site.

=== Elbe ===
Bridges across the Elbe (Elbbrücken) in Hamburg; some 40 km (25 mi) of the Elbe's total of 1,094 km (680 mi) lie within Hamburg. Up-stream, the next bridge (outside the Hamburg state borders) is located at Geesthacht; down-stream there are no more bridges.

==== Norderelbe ====
Bridges across the Norderelbe

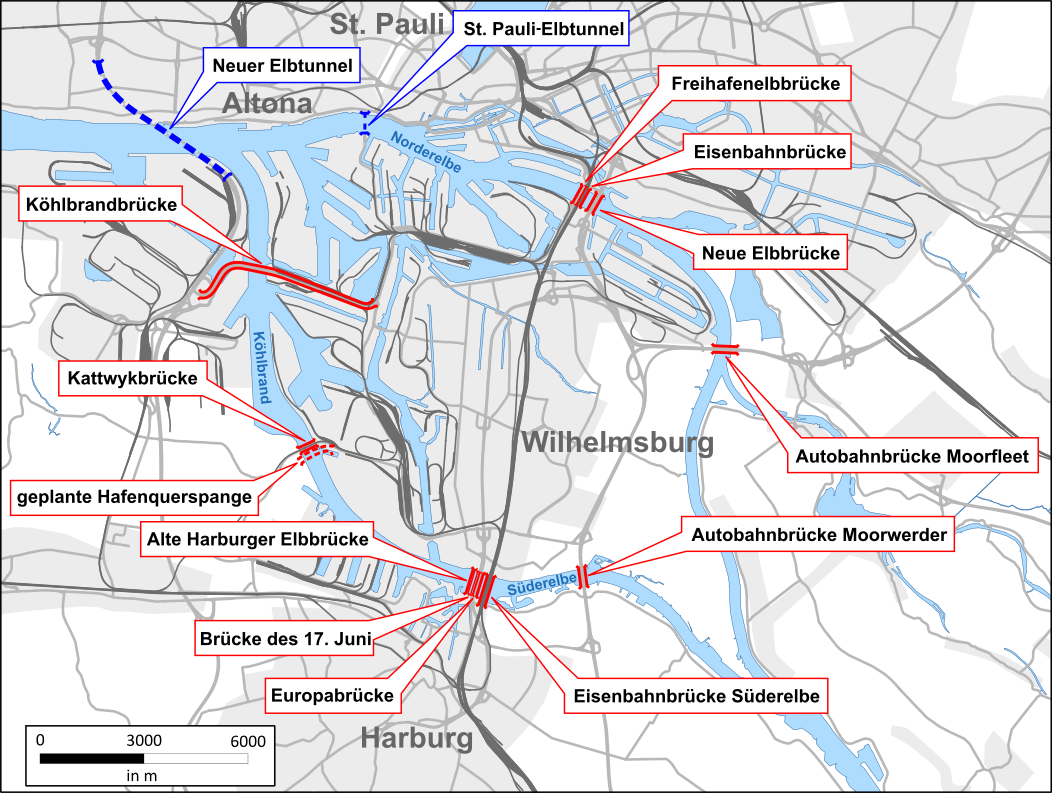
Map of bridges across the Norder- and Süderelbe. The two Elbe anabranches are separated by the island of Wilhelmsburg (center). Neue Freihafenbrücke and Köhlbrandbrücke are the last bridges on the respective riverarm, and also the Elbe's last bridges before reaching the North Sea. Only subsequent river crossings are the Old Elbe Tunnel in St. Pauli and the Bundesautobahn 7's New Elbe Tunnel west of Altona.

Image	Name	Built	Length	Location	Notes
	↓ Elbe (Hamburg state border)				
	Moorfleeter Brücke; 53°31′0″N 10°4′0″E	1962	411 m (1,348 ft)	Moorfleet, Wilhelmsburg	designed by Hellmut Homberg, carries Bundesautobahn 1
	Neue Elbbrücke; 53°32′0″N 10°2′0″E	1887 (1959)	304.7 m (1,000 ft)	Veddel, Rothenburgsort, Hammerbrook	designed by Hermann Lohse, carries Bundesstraße 4 and 75
	Eisenbahnbrücke; 53°31′58″N 10°1′23″E	1872		Veddel, Rothenburgsort, Hammerbrook	designed by Heinrich Strack; carries the Hanover–Hamburg and Wanne-Eickel–Hamburg railway lines
	Neue Freihafenelbbrücke	1917	340 m (1,120 ft)	Veddel, Rothenburgsort, Hammerbrook	carries the Hamburg port railway
	↓ confluence with Süderelbe to become Niederelbe (Lower Elbe)				

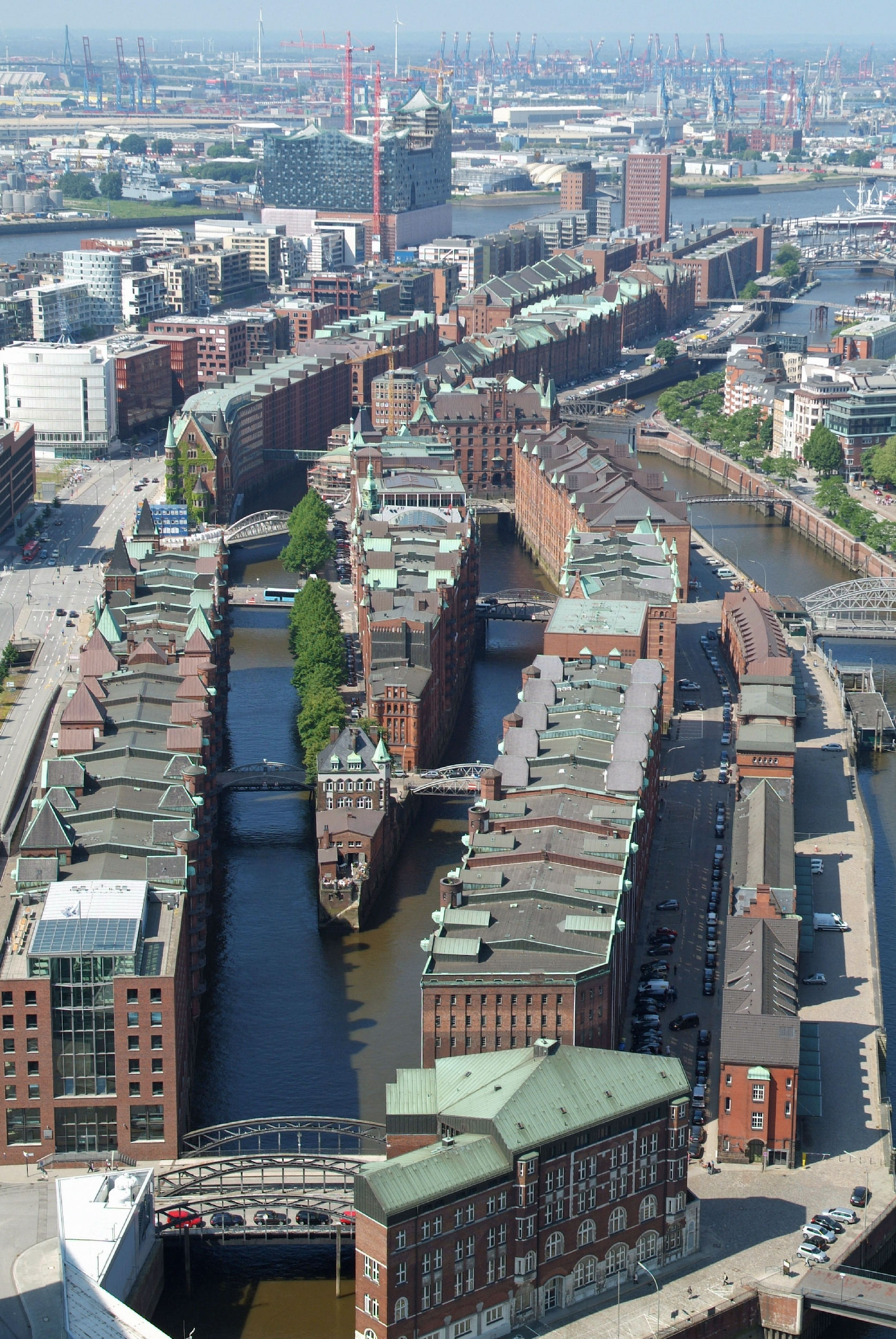
Aerial view of the Speicherstadt's Holländischbrookfleet and Wandrahmsfleet (center) and the Zollkanal (far right).

===== Oberhafen, Zollkanal and Binnenhafen =====
Bridges across Oberhafen, Zollkanal and Binnenhafen between Hammerbrook, Altstadt and HafenCity

- Oberhafenkanal
  - Billhorner Brücke
  - Oberhafenkanalbrücke
  - Bahnbrücke
- Oberhafen
  - Oberhafenbrücke (1904, 152 m)
  - Oberbaumbrücke
- Zollkanal
  - Wandrahmsteg
  - Kornhausbrücke (1899, 45 m)
  - Jungfernbrücke (1888, 41 m)
  - Kibbelsteg (1890, 220 m)
  - Brooksbrücke (1888, 50 m)
  - Kehrwiedersteg (1890)
- Binnenhafen
  - Niederbaumbrücke (1880)

===== Speicherstadt and HafenCity canals =====
Bridges across Speicherstadt and HafenCity canals within HafenCity (sorted alphabetically by name of waterbody)

- Baakenhafen
  - Baakenhafenbrücke (2013, 170 m)
- Brooksfleet
  - Kibbelsteg (1890, 220 m)
- Brooktorhafen
  - Brooktorkaibrücke
  - Leónbrücke
  - Shanghaibrücke
- Ericusgraben
  - Ericusbrücke (1872)
- Holländischbrookfleet
  - Holländischbrookfleetbrücke
- Kehrwiederfleet
  - Sandbrücke
  - Kehrwiedersteg (1890)
  - Wilheminenbrücke
- Kleines Fleet
  - Pickhubenbrücke
  - Kannengießerbrücke
- Magdeburger Hafen
  - Busanbrücke
  - Magdeburger Brücke
- Sandtorhafen
  - Mahatma-Gandhi-Brücke
- St. Annenfleet
  - St. Annenbrücke
  - Neuerwegsbrücke
- Wandrahmsfleet
  - Poggenmühlenbrücke
  - Wandrahmsfleetbrücke
  - Wandbereiterbrücke
  - Kannengießerortbrücke

==== Süderelbe ====
Bridges across the Süderelbe

Image	Name	Built	Length	Location	Notes
	↓ Elbe (Hamburg state border)				
	Moorwerder Brücke; 53°28′0″N 10°1′0″E		970 m (3,180 ft)	Moorwerder, Wilhelmsburg	carries Bundesautobahn 1
	Eisenbahnbrücke; 53°28′25″N 9°59′44″E	1872 (1979)	340 m (1,120 ft)	Harburg, Wilhelmsburg	carries the Hanover–Hamburg and Wanne-Eickel–Hamburg railway lines
	Europabrücke; 53°31′58″N 10°1′23″E	1983	471 m (1,545 ft)	Harburg, Wilhelmsburg	carries Bundesautobahn 253
	Brücke des 17. Juni	1937 (1949)	472 m (1,549 ft)	Harburg, Wilhelmsburg	originally named Wilhelmsburger Brücke, renamed after the 1953 uprising in East Germany
	Alte Harburger Elbbrücke; 53°28′0″N 10°0′0″E	1899	474 m (1,555 ft)	Harburg, Wilhelmsburg	designed by Hubert Stier
	Kattwykbrücke; 53°29′40″N 9°57′6″E	1973	290 m (950 ft)	Moorburg, Wilhelmsburg	the world's tallest lift bridge, with a liftable height of 46 m (151 ft)
	↓ Süderelbe continues as Köhlbrand				
	Köhlbrandbrücke; 53°31′18″N 9°56′18″E	1974	3,940 m (12,930 ft)	Waltershof, Steinwerder	designed by Paul Boué, Egon Jux and Hans Wittfoht; was the world's longest cable-stayed bridge from 1974 to 1991
	↓ confluence with Norderelbe to become Niederelbe (Lower Elbe)				

=== Este ===
Bridges across the Este in Hamburg; only 2 km (1.2 mi) of the Este's total of 62 km (39 mi) lie within the state borders of Hamburg.

- Cranzer Rollbrücke
- Estesperrwerkbrücke

=== Harburg canals ===
Bridges across harbor basins and canals in Harburg; the port of Harburg is indirectly fed through the Seeve.

- Östlicher Bahnhofskanal
  - Östliche Bahnhofskanalklappbrücke
- Westlicher Bahnhofskanal
  - Westliche Bahnhofskanalklappbrücke
- Lotsekanal
  - Lotsebrücke
- Holzhafen
  - Holzhafenbrücke

=== Wilhelmsburg canals ===
Bridges across Elbe anabranches and canals on the island of Wilhelmsburg (including the islands of Steinwerder, Kleiner Grasbrook and Veddel)

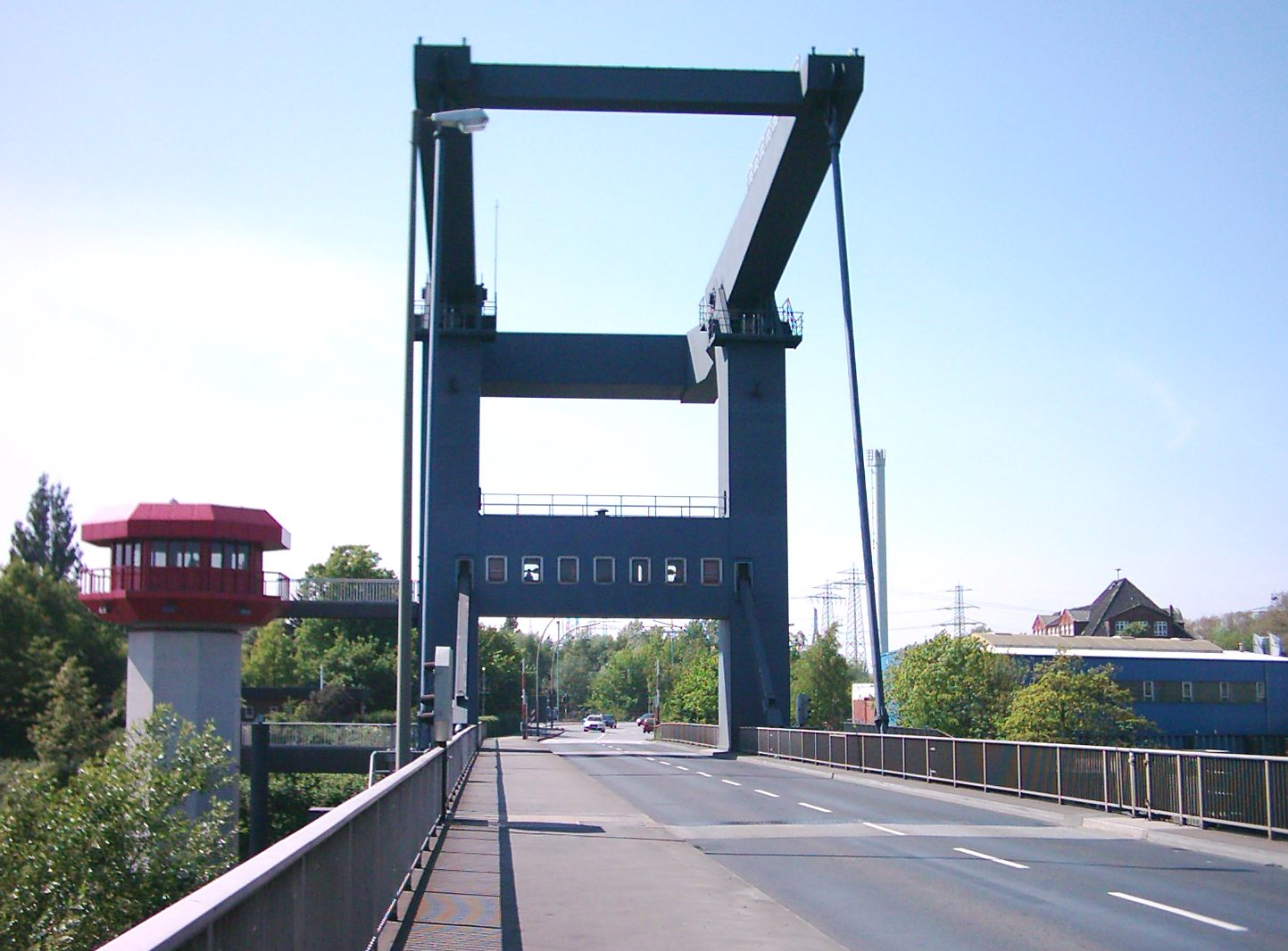
Reiherstieg Bascule Bridge (1984)

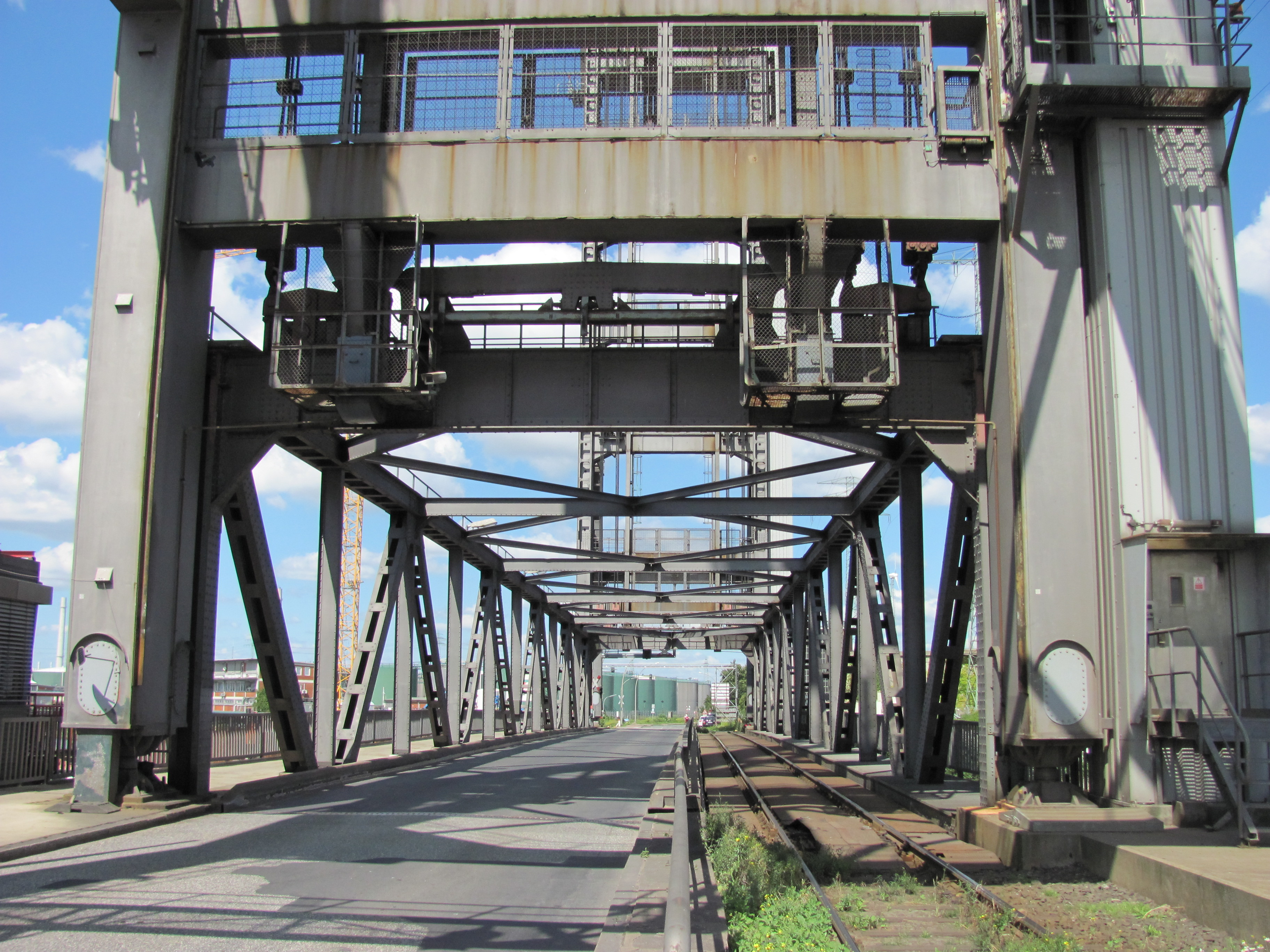
Rethe Lift Bridge (1934)

- Aßmannkanal
  - Aßmannkanalbrücke
- Grevenhofkanal
  - Grevenhofbrücke
  - Grevenhofkanalbrücke
- Marktkanal
  - Marktkanalbrücke
- Moorkanal
  - Moorkanalbrücke
- Müggenburger Kanal
  - Reginenortbrücke
- Müggenburger Zollhafen
  - Müggenburger Zollhafenbrücke
  - Wilhelmsburger Brücke
- Peutekanal
  - Erste Peutebrücke
  - Zweite Peutebrücke
- Querkanal
  - Erste Querbrücke
  - Zweite Querbrücke
- Reiherstieg
  - Argentinienbrücke
  - Ellerholzbrücke
  - Reiherstiegbrücke (1985, 100 m)
- Rethe
  - Rethebrücke (1934, 73 m)
- Roßkanal
  - Roßkanalbrücke
  - Howaltbrücke
  - Hachmannbrücke
- Saalehafen
  - Sachsenbrücke
  - Niedernfelder Brücke
- Spreehafen
  - Spreehafenbrücke
- Veddelkanal
  - Brandenburger Brücke
  - Veddelkanalbrücke
- Veringkanal
  - Neue Veringkanalbrücke
  - Wollkämmereibrücke

== Bridges elsewhere ==
Please note, this section only lists bridges and viaducts in Hamburg, not listed above (i.e. only bridges and viaducts not crossing a body of water).

=== Railway bridges and viaducts ===
Hamburg U-Bahn (Hochbahn) viaducts

- Barmbek Markt (A 75) Viaduct (1912, 412 m)
- Baumwall Viaduct (1912)
- Isestraße Viaduct (1912, 825 m)
- Rödingsmarkt Viaduct (1912)
- Volksdorfer Straße Viaduct
- Vorsetzen (A 199) Viaduct (1912, 240 m)
- Walddörferbahnviadukt

Other railway viaducts

- Sternbrücke (1893, 75 m)
- Oberer Landweg Eisenbahnbrücke

=== Road bridges and viaducts ===
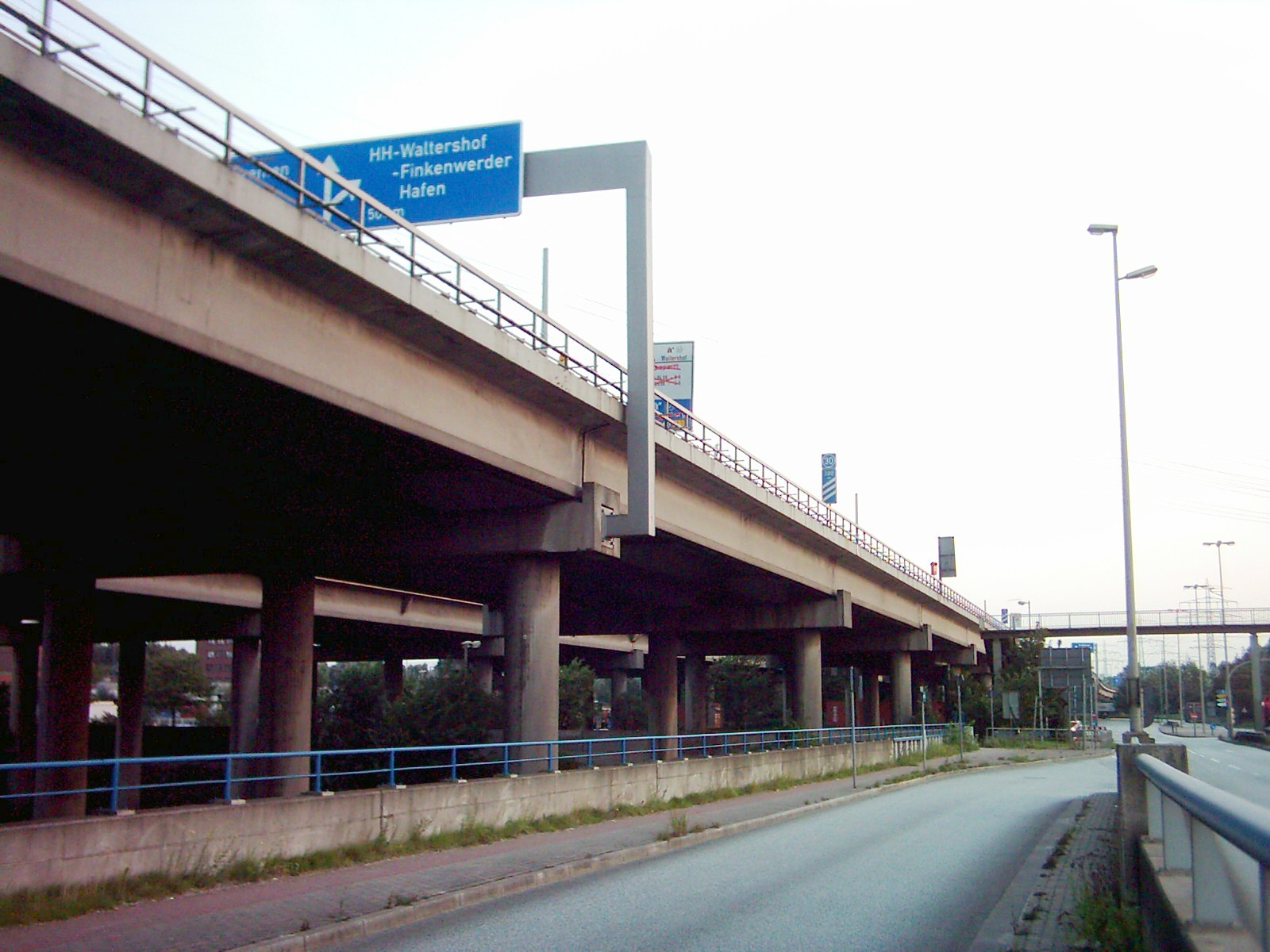
Carrying Bundesautobahn 7, Hochstraße Elbmarsch is Germany's longest road bridge at a length of 4,258 m (13,970 ft).

- Hochstraße Elbmarsch (1973, 4,258 m)
- Kersten-Miles-Brücke (1897, 47 m)
- Simon-von-Utrecht-Brücke

=== Foot bridges ===
- Cremonbrücke (1982)
- Johan-van-Valckenburgh-Brücke

== See also ==
- St. Pauli Landing Bridges (Landungsbrücken)
- List of rivers of Hamburg
- List of bridges

== Literature ==
- Sven Bardua: Brückenmetropole Hamburg, Dölling und Galitz, Hamburg, 2009
- Horst Beckershaus: Die Hamburger Brücken: ihre Namen, woher sie kommen und was sie bedeuten, Convent, Hamburg, 2007, ISBN 3866330073
- Ralf Lange: Architekturführer Hamburg/Architectural Guide to Hamburg, Edition Axel Menges, Fellbach, 1995, ISBN 3930698587
