= Köhlbrand Bridge =

Bridge in Hamburg (Germany)

Köhlbrandbrücke Köhlbrand Bridge
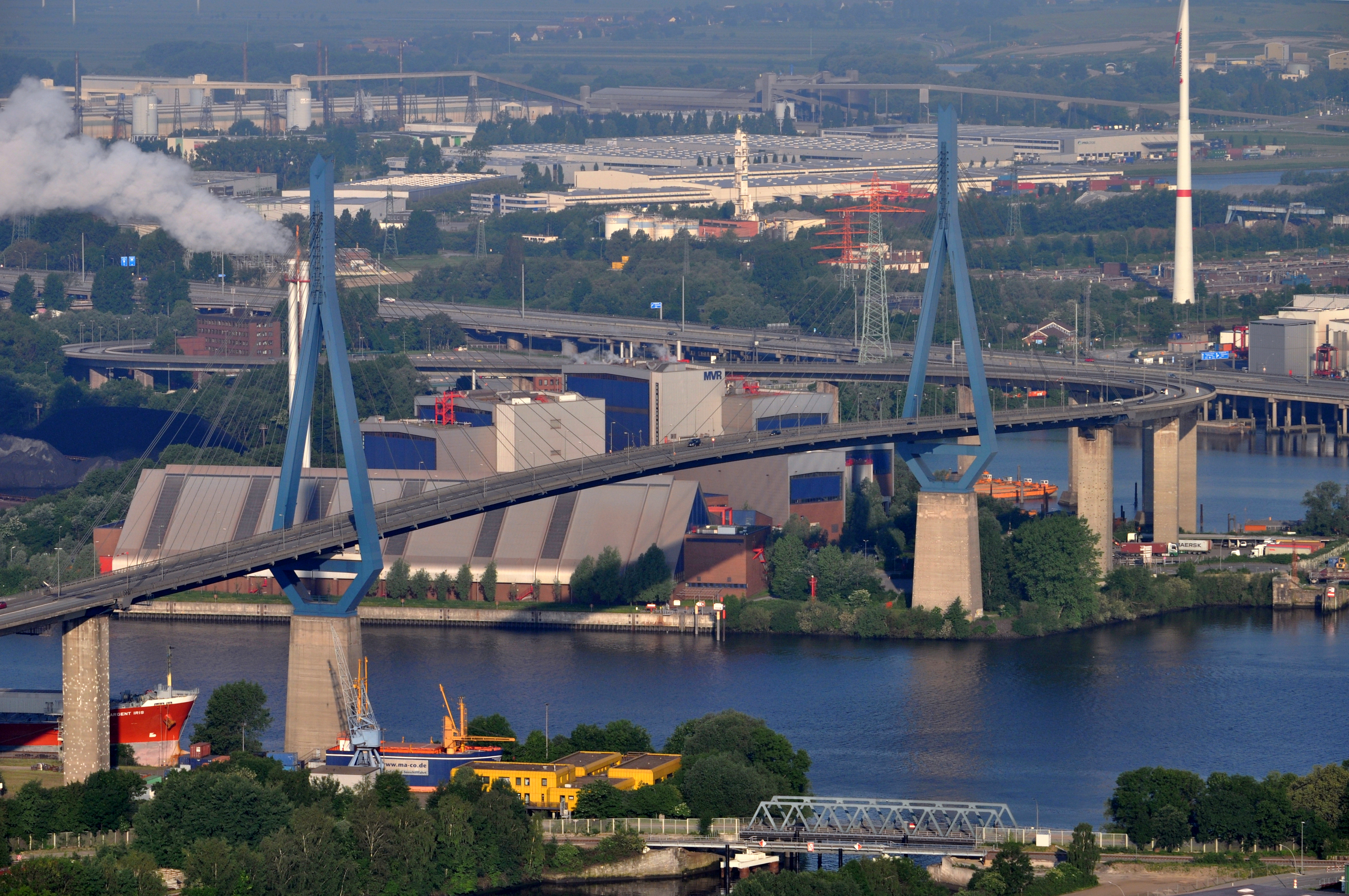
- Köhlbrand Bridge in the port of Hamburg
- Coordinates: 53°31′17″N 9°56′22″E
- Carries: Cars
- Crosses: Köhlbrand, part of the river Süderelbe
- Locale: Hamburg, Germany

Characteristics
- Design: Cable-stayed bridge
- Total length: 3,618 m
- Width: 17.5 m
- Height: 135 m
- Longest span: 325 m
- Clearance below: 55 m above middle tide

History
- Construction start: 1970
- Construction end: 1974
- Opened: September 20, 1974
- Closed: approx 2028

Statistics
- Daily traffic: 30,000 cars
- Toll: free

The Köhlbrand Bridge (German: Köhlbrandbrücke) is a cable-stayed bridge in Hamburg, Germany, which connects the harbor area on the island of Wilhelmsburg between the Norderelbe and Süderelbe branches of the Elbe river with motorway 7 (exit Waltershof). It bridges the Süderelbe, here called Köhlbrand, before it unites with the Norderelbe again. The bridge was opened on 9 September 1974.

== See also ==
- List of bridges in Hamburg
- List of bridges in Germany
