= Elbbrücken =

Elbbrücken (Elbe bridges) may refer to:

- Elbe bridges, several different bridges over River Elbe
- Elbbrücken (Hamburg), the specific bridges over River Elbe in Hamburg, Germany
- Elbbrücken station, a station in Hamburg, Germany, named after Hamburg Elbbrücken
