= Michael Kruse (politician) =

German politician (born 1983)

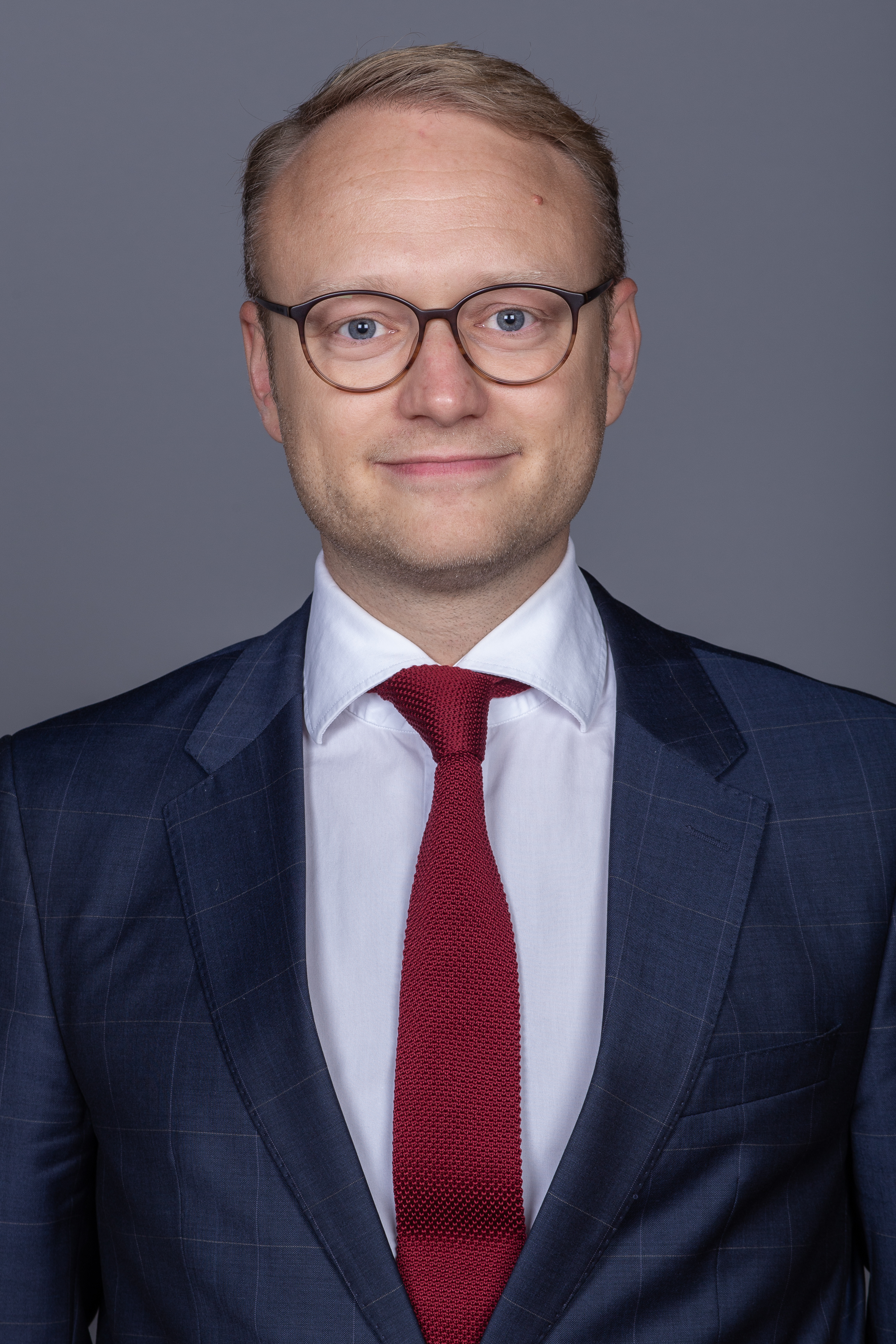
Kruse in 2018

Michael Kruse (born 30 December 1983) is a German politician (FDP). From March 2015 to March 2020, Kruse was a member of the Hamburg Parliament. He has been the state chairman of the Hamburg FDP since 25 April 2021.

== Early life and profession ==
Kruse was born and raised in Hamburg. After graduating from the Johannes-Brahms-Gymnasium in Hamburg-Bramfeld, he studied Macroeconomics at the University of Hamburg from 2003 to 2008 and at the University of Liverpool from 2005 to 2006.

After graduating with a bachelor in economics, Kruse worked as an independent business consultant in Hamburg and Berlin until 2011. Since his election to the Hamburg Parliament in March 2015 he has been pursuing this activity again and has since also worked as commercial director of the Heidelberg-based consulting firm Cogitars GmbH. Kruse is single and has no children.

== Political career ==
Kruse has been a member of the FDP since 2007. From 2010 to 2012, he was a member of the federal executive committee of the Young Liberals (Germany). From 2011 to 2015, Kruse was parliamentary party director of the FDP parliamentary group in the Hamburg Parliament.

=== Career in state politics ===
In the 2015 Hamburg state election, Kruse was elected to the Hamburg parliament at party-list position 3 on the state list of the FDP Hamburg. His Electoral district as a member of Landtag includes the districts of Barmbek-Nord, Barmbek-Süd, Dulsberg, Hohenfelde, Hamburg and Uhlenhorst. He was a member of the parliamentary group's executive committee as Chief Whip of the FDP parliamentary group and was the politico-economic spokesman of the parliamentary group. His topics were in particular the classical Economic policy such as port, skilled crafts and trade and industry as well as the strengthening of Hamburg's start-up scene. In addition, he was responsible for the area of public enterprises. Kruse was a member of the following committees: Committee for Economy, Innovation and Media, Committee Public Enterprises, Committee for Environment and Energy, Health Committee, Data Protection Committee and Europe Committee. He was also a member of the Council of Elders of the Bundestag of the Hamburg Parliament.

Following the previous parliamentary group leader Katja Suding's election to the Bundestag in the 2017 German federal election, Kruse was elected chairman of the Bürgerschaftsfraktion together with the previous deputy parliamentary group leader Anna-Elisabeth von Treuenfels-Frowein.

After the FDP failed to clear the five-percent hurdle in the 2020 Hamburg state election, the FDP's parliamentary group disbanded and Kruse had to resign from parliament.

=== Member of the German Parliament, 2021–2025 ===
On 24 April 2021 Kruse was elected as the top candidate of the Hamburg FDP for the 2021 German federal election. The following day, he was also elected as the new state chairman of the Elbe Liberals, succeeding Katja Suding.

In the negotiations to form a so-called traffic light coalition of the Social Democratic Party (SPD), the Green Party and the FDP following the 2021 German elections, Kruse was part of his party's delegation in the working group on economic affairs, co-chaired by Carsten Schneider, Cem Özdemir and Michael Theurer.

In parliament, Kruse was a full member of the Transport Committee, as well as the Committee on Climate Protection and Energy. In addition to his committee assignments, he was part of the German-British Parliamentary Friendship Group.

In November 2024, Kruse announced that he would not stand in the 2025 federal elections but instead resign from active politics by the end of the parliamentary term.
