= Elbbrücken (Hamburg) =

Group of bridges across the Elbe in Hamburg

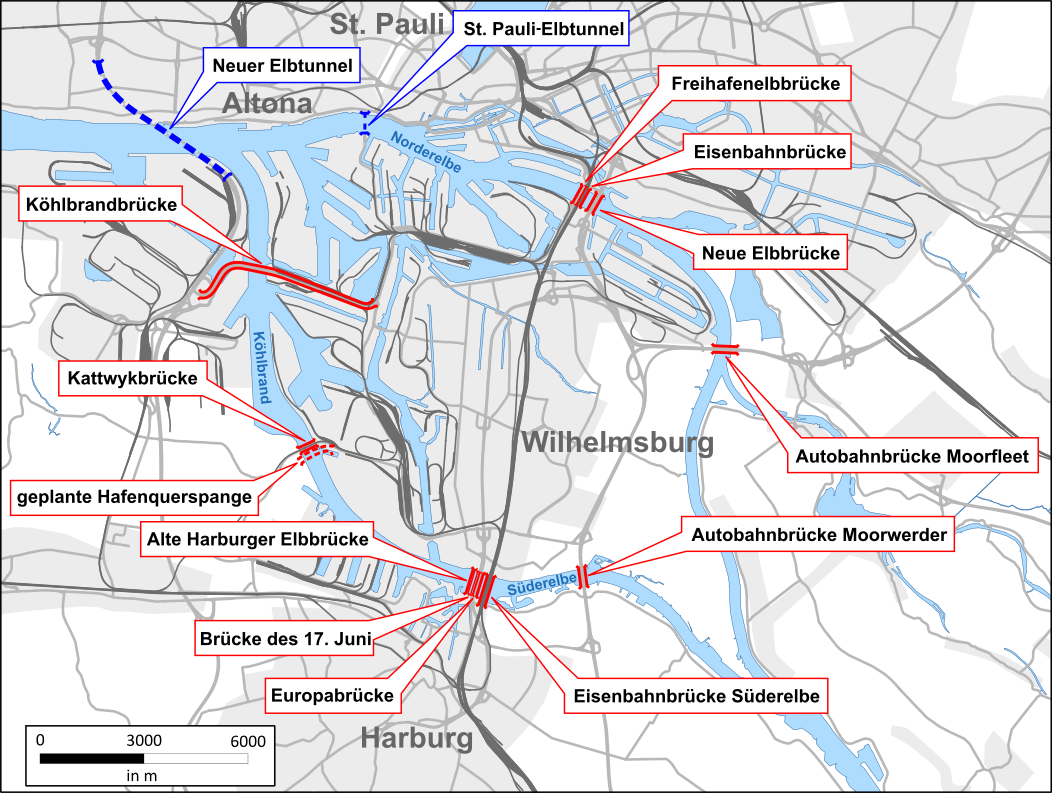
Map of Hamburg Elbe crossings, specific Elbbrücken are marked in red over Norderelbe and Süderelbe

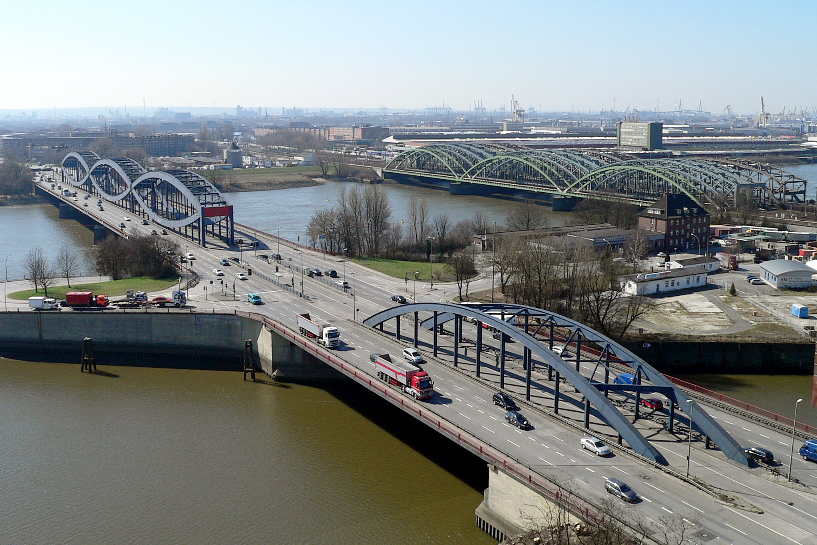
The Norderelbbrücken, commonly referred to simply as Elbbrücken

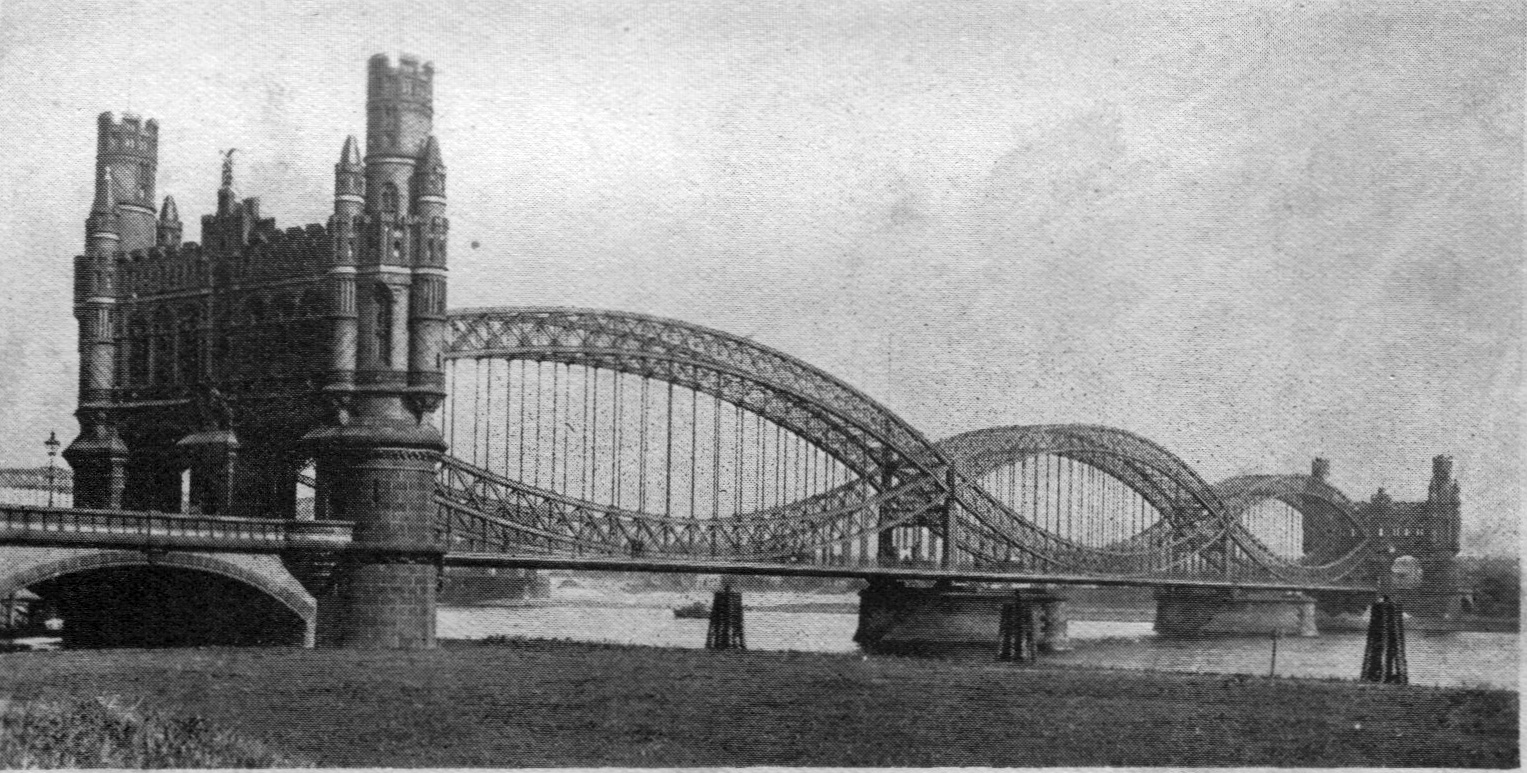
The Neue Elbbrücke was originally decorated with two neogothic towers before these were destroyed during the bridge's widening in 1959.

The Elbbrücken (Elbe bridges) are several independent bridge structures crossing the river Elbe in Hamburg, Germany. Within Hamburg, the Elbe divides into two main anabranches, the Norderelbe (Northern Elbe) and the Süderelbe (Southern Elbe), which, after the Alte Süderelbe (Old Southern Elbe) was sealed off, reunite with the Norderelbe via the Köhlbrand anabranch, bypassing the Elbe islands, of which Wilhelmsburg is the largest river island on the Elbe.

In particular, the term refers to several parallel railroad and road bridges over River Elbe in central Hamburg, divided into Norderelbbrücken (Northern Elbe bridges) and Süderelbbrücken (Southern Elbe bridges). They emerged from the first crossings over River Elbe, and today, due to the low headroom, form a barrier east of the Port of Hamburg which can't be passed by sea ships. Today, especially the Norderelbbrücken are considered a landmark of Hamburg.

The Hamburg Elbbrücken, along with the Old Elbe Tunnel (1911, below Norderelbe) and the New Elbe Tunnel (1975, under re-united River Elbe), form the last fixed Elbe crossings before the mouth into the North Sea.

The bridges constitute an important link within the city-state of Hamburg and connect the districts north of the Elbe, including the inner city of Hamburg with the Wilhelmsburg, the Veddel and the port area as well as with the borough of Harburg to the south of the Elbe and the region beyond.

In addition, the Elbe bridges have a significant national function as a north-south link in European rail traffic and within the crossings of the federal motorways (A 1, A 253) and federal highways (B 4 / B 75).

In the entire Hamburg city area, all road signs to Neue Elbbrücke (New Elbe Bridge) and Brücke des 17. Juni (Bridge of 17th June), which are both part of the Hamburg Elbbrücken are generally signposted only as Elbbrücken, as the Freihafenelbbrücke (former free economic zone) and the motorway bridges are excluded and journeys over the other bridges would be a detour.

== History ==
The first fixed crossings over the Norderelbe were established in 1872 as a railway bridge, in 1887 as a road bridge.

== Literature ==
- Sven Bardua: Brückenmetropole Hamburg, Dölling und Galitz, Hamburg 2009, ISBN 978-3-937904-88-7.
