= Michael Kruse =

Michael Kruse may refer to:

- Michael Kruse (judge) (born 1948), chief justice of the High Court of American Samoa
- Michael Kruse (politician) (born 1983), German politician
