= Norderelbe =

River in Germany

Coordinates: 53°32′N 9°56′E

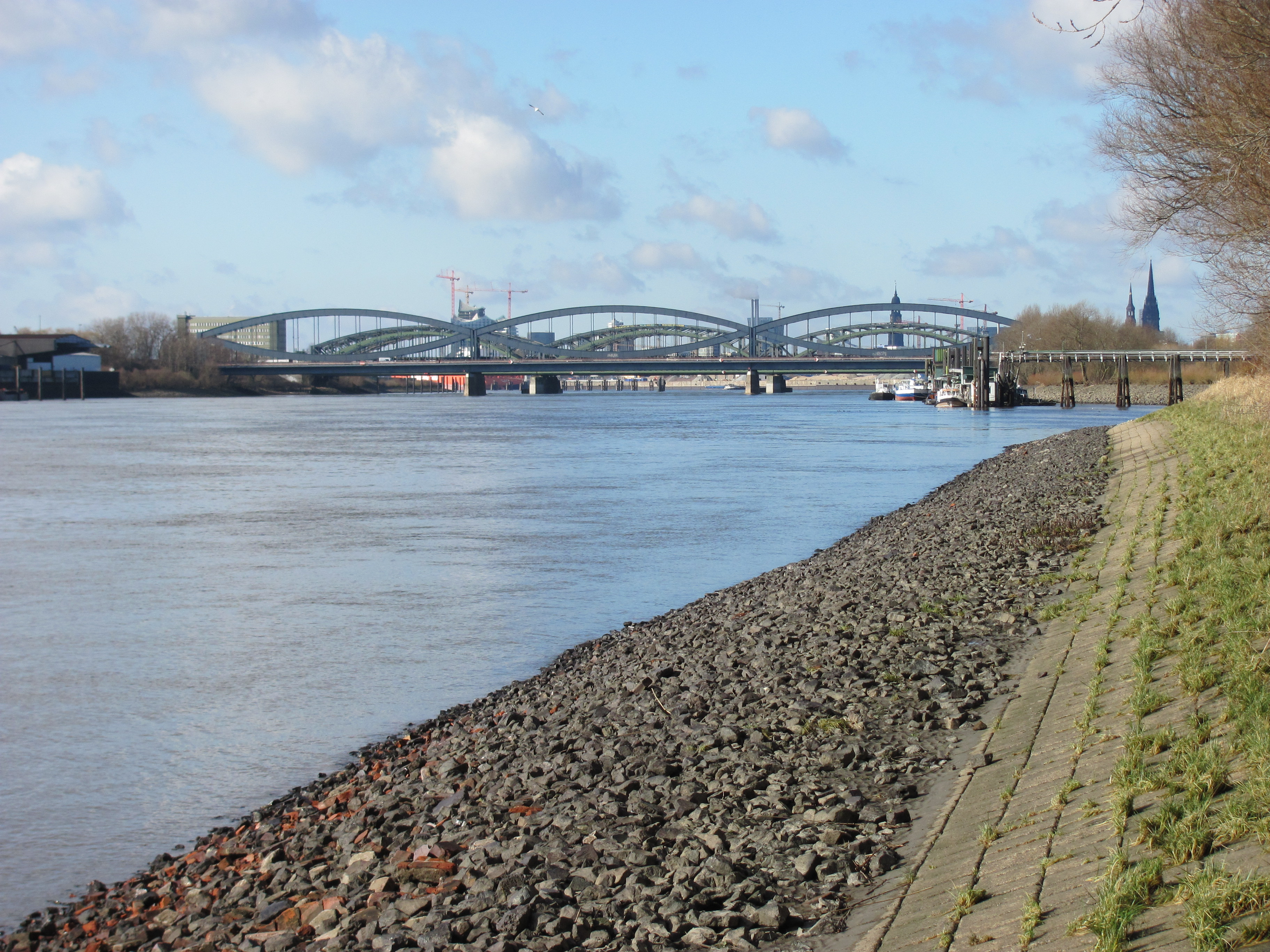

Location
- Country: Germany
- States: Hamburg

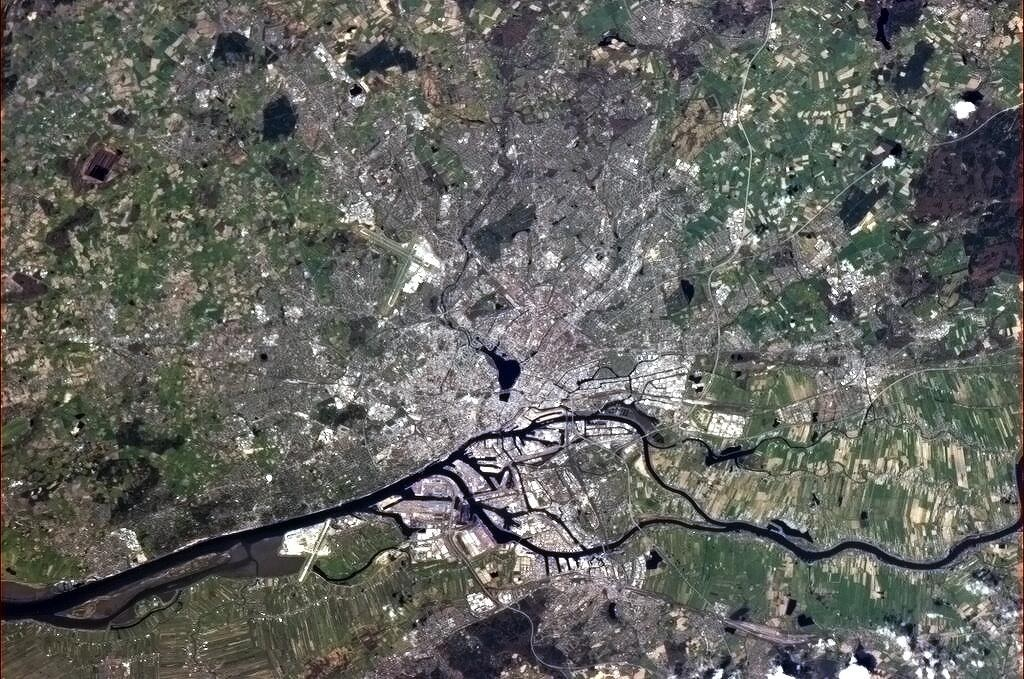
Norderelbe, Süderelbe and the island of Wilhelmsburg

The Norderelbe (German pronunciation) (Northern Elbe) is one of the two big anabranches of the Unterelbe river in the area which is now the Port of Hamburg, Germany. The other anabranch is the Süderelbe. Together they form the island of Wilhelmsburg.

== See also ==
- List of rivers of Hamburg
- List of bridges in Hamburg
