= Hohenfelde, Hamburg =

Quarter in Hamburg, Germany

Hohenfelde
- Quarter of Hamburg
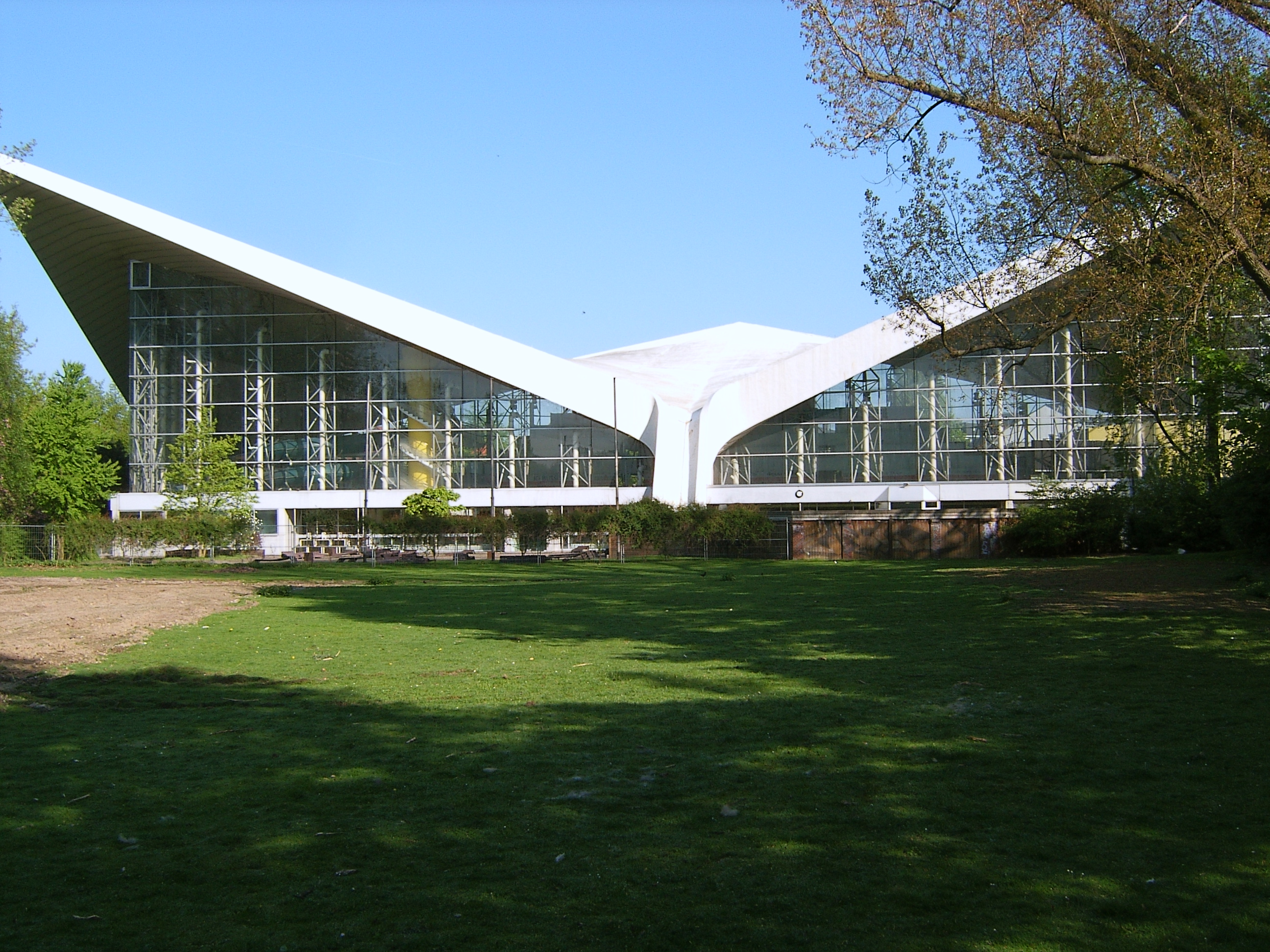

- Location of Hohenfelde in Hamburg
- Interactive map of Hohenfelde
- Location within Germany Location within Hamburg
- Coordinates: 53.561°N 10.021°E
- Country: Germany
- State: Hamburg
- City: Hamburg
- Borough: Hamburg-Nord

Area
  - Total: 1.1 km^{2} (0.42 sq mi)

Population (2024-12-31)
  - Total: 10,097
  - Density: 9,200/km^{2} (24,000/sq mi)
- Time zone: UTC+01:00 (CET)
  - Summer (DST): UTC+02:00 (CEST)
- Dialling codes: 040
- Vehicle registration: HH

Hohenfelde (German pronunciation: [hoːənˈfɛldə]) is a quarter of Hamburg, Germany in the Hamburg-Nord borough.

== Geography ==
Hohenfelde borders the quarters Uhlenhorst, Eilbek, Borgfelde, and St. Georg.

== Politics ==
These are the results of Hohenfelde in the Hamburg state election:

Election	SPD	Greens	Left	CDU	FDP	AfD	Others
2020	33,4 %	33,0 %	9,5 %	8,5 %	4,6 %	4,4 %	6,6 %
2015	44,6 %	14,4 %	9,4 %	12,9 %	8,8 %	5,4 %	4,1 %
2011	46,7 %	14,6 %	6,6 %	19,2 %	7,6 %	–	5,3 %
2008	33,0 %	11,2 %	4,9 %	42,1 %	6,9 %	–	1,9 %
2004	32,0 %	15,0 %	–	45,1 %	3,3 %	–	4,6 %
2001	37,8 %	11,5 %	0,6 %	26,0 %	5,6 %	–	18,5 %
1997	34,8 %	18,3 %	0,8 %	28,7 %	3,9 %	–	13,5 %
1993	41,3 %	15,6 %	–	24,4 %	4,2 %	–	14,5 %
1991	46,2 %	8,9 %	0,7 %	34,9 %	5,5 %	–	3,8 %
1987	42,2 %	8,6 %	–	41,8 %	6,2 %	–	1,2 %
1986	36,4 %	12,8 %	–	44,5 %	5,1 %	–	1,2 %
Dec. 1982	45,6 %	8,6 %	–	41,9 %	2,9 %	–	1,0 %
June 1982	36,8 %	9,7 %	–	46,4 %	4,8 %	–	2,3 %
1978	44,4 %	4,5 %	–	42,1 %	6,5 %	–	2,5 %
1974	34,3 %	–	–	48,7 %	12,8 %	–	3,8 %
1970	47,6 %	–	–	40,3 %	7,0 %	–	5,1 %
1966	47,5 %	–	–	39,7 %	8,0 %	–	4,8 %
