= Köhlbrand =

River in Germany

Coordinates: 53°33′N 9°56′E

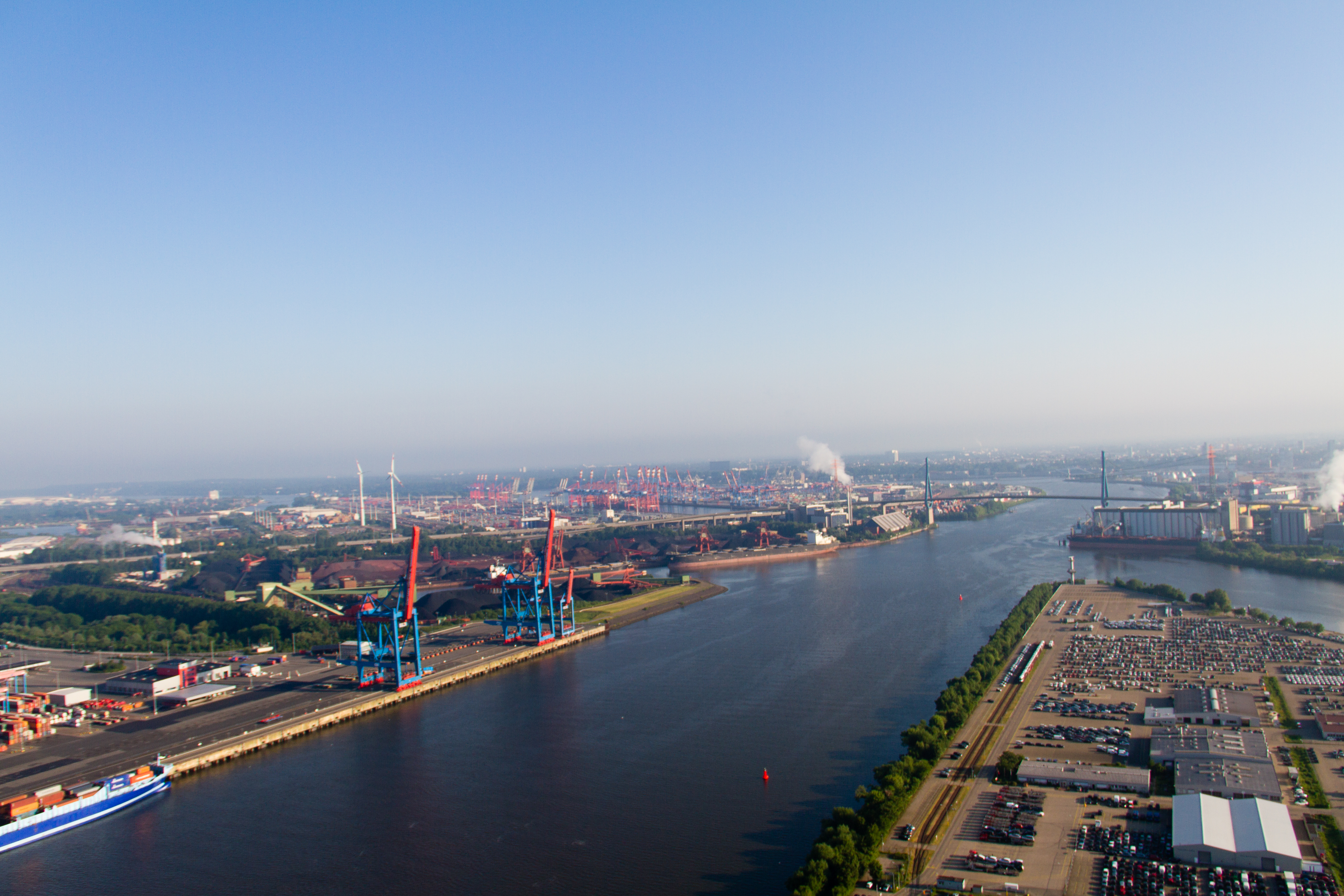
- Aerial view from the south

Location
- Country: Germany
- States: Hamburg

Basin features
- River system: Elbe

Köhlbrand is an anabranch of the Unterelbe river in the Port of Hamburg, Germany. It has a width of approximately 325 metres (1,066 ft).

== History ==
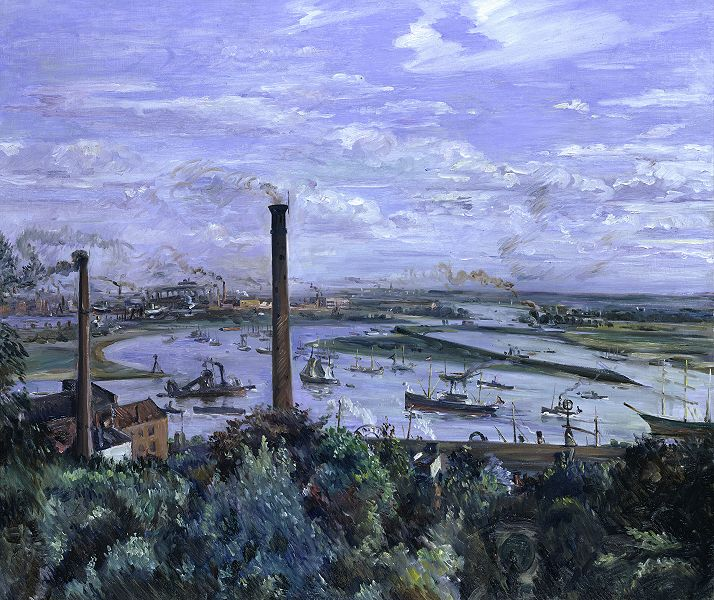
View on the Köhlbrand, painting by Lovis Corinth, 1911 (View from the north)

The branch emerged during floods in the 14th and 15th centuries, which separated the former Elbe island of Gorieswerder.

The Köhlbrand is bridged by the Köhlbrand Bridge, both probably named after charcoal burners (Köhler), whose fires (Brand) could be seen along the river banks and who sold coal to the boatmen. Until the 19th century dockyards were located at the banks of Köhlbrand. According to the third Köhlbrand treaty signed in 1908, the anabranch was relocated around 600 metres (2,000 ft) to the west and deepened by 4 metres (13 ft) to 8.4 metres (28 ft). Its former pathway is marked by the harbour basin of Kohlenschiffhafen, which is almost completely filled up with sand today.

Nowadays, the complete Süderelbe waterflow is redirected through the Köhlbrand, which is a main access to the Container Terminal Altenwerder.

== See also ==
- List of rivers of Hamburg
