= Unterelbe =

River in Germany

Coordinates: 53°36′N 9°35′E

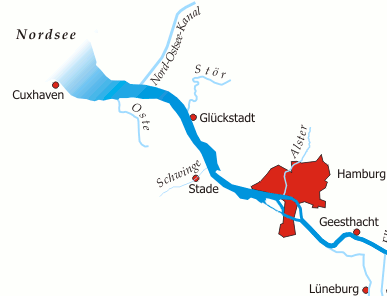
- Unterelbe, from Geesthacht to Cuxhaven

Location
- Country: Germany
- State: Hamburg

Basin features
- River system: Elbe

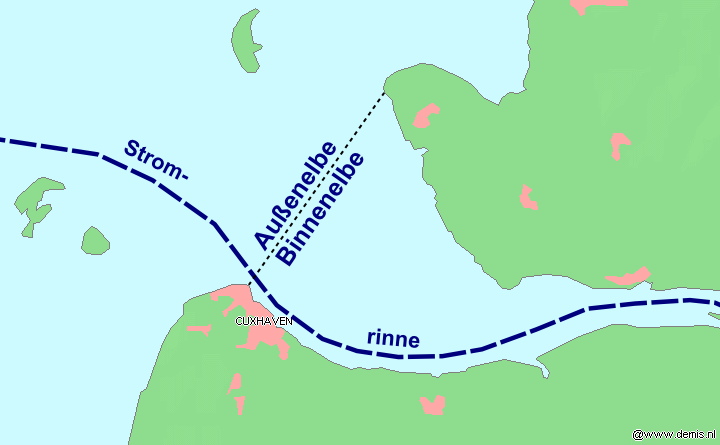
Binnenelbe, Außenelbe

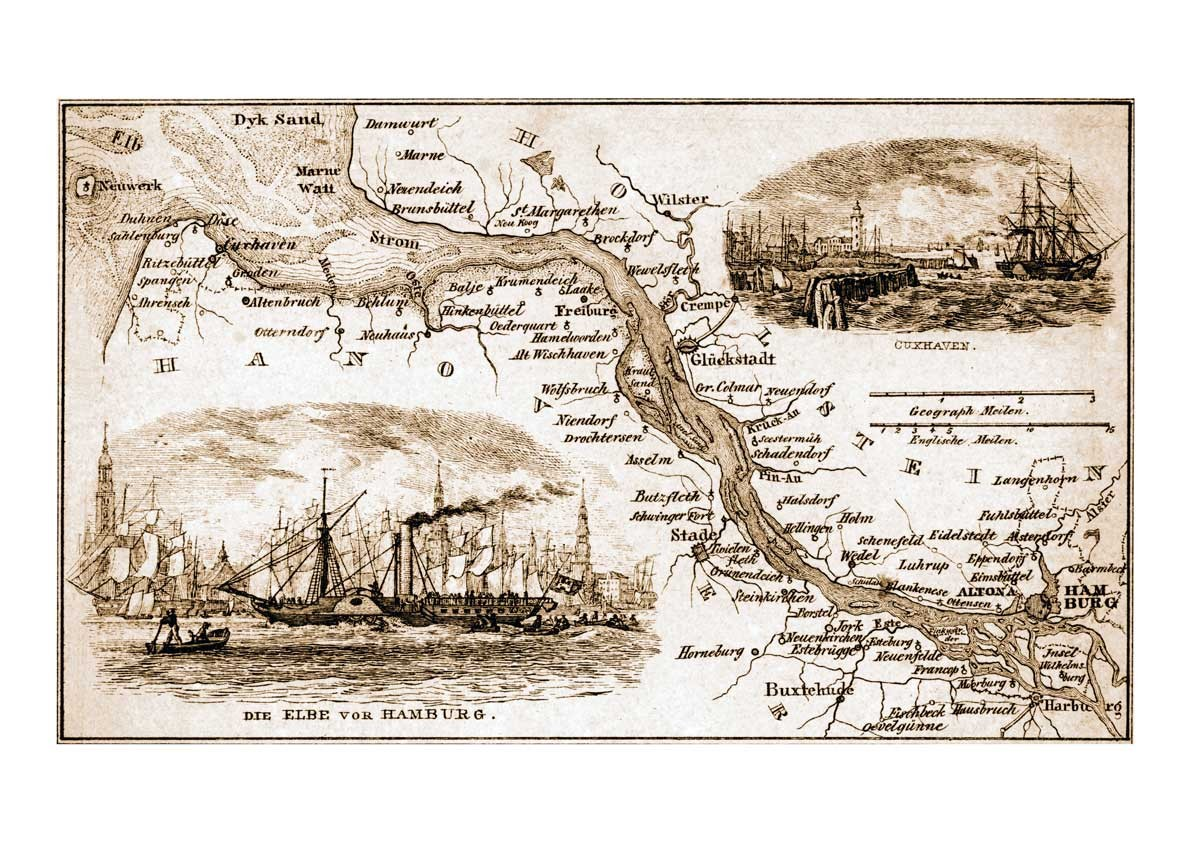
Chart 1860

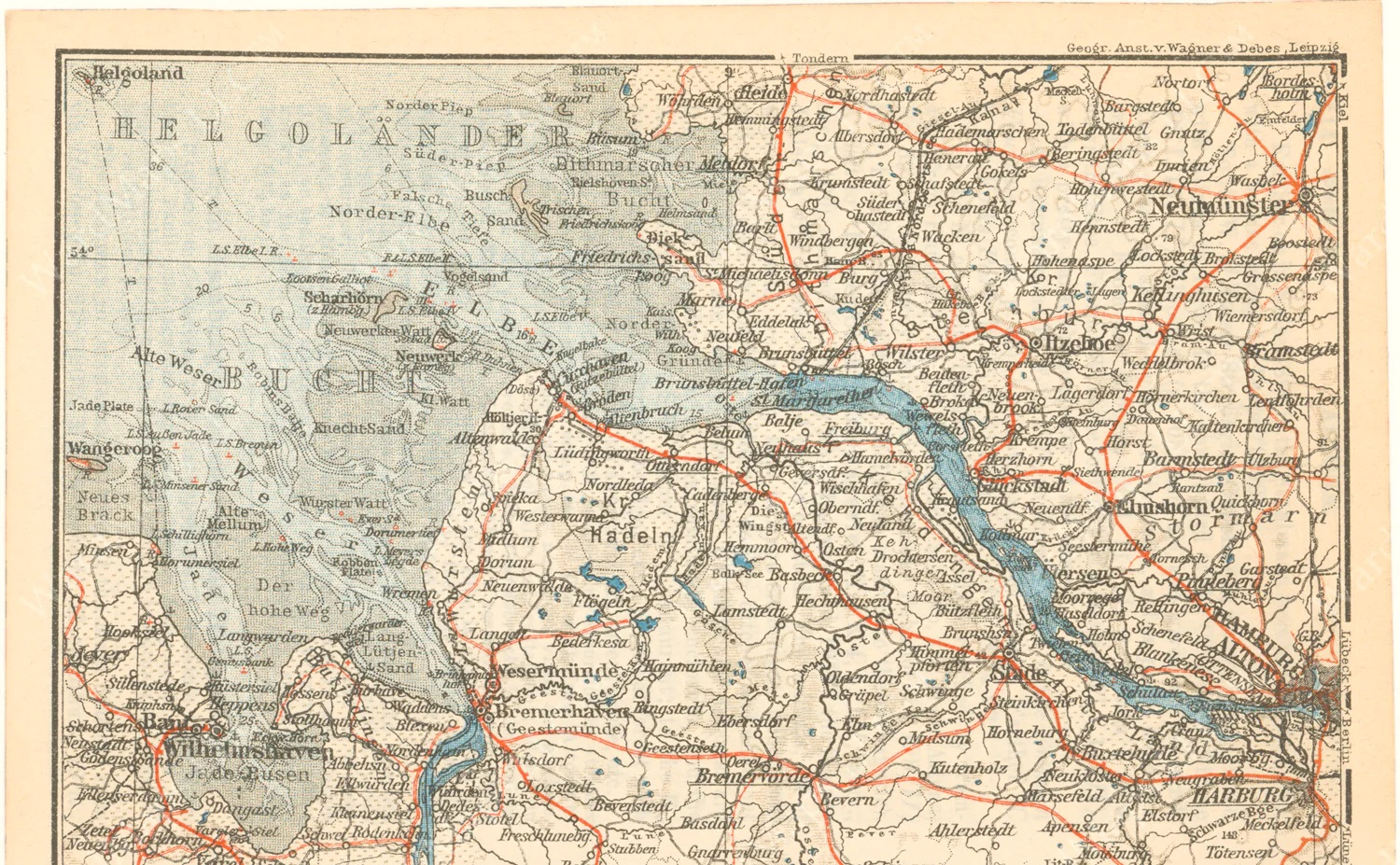
Chart 1910

The Unterelbe (German pronunciation: [ˈʊntɐˌʔɛlbə]) or, in English usually the Lower Elbe, refers to the lower reaches of the river Elbe in Germany influenced by the tides.

It starts at kilometre 586, at the sluice of Geesthacht, where the Elbe forms the border between Lower Saxony and Schleswig-Holstein. It continues downstream, then forming the border between Lower Saxony and Hamburg, before fully entering Hamburg territory. In Hamburg the Unterelbe forms two anabranches, Norderelbe and Süderelbe, the latter now partially a cut-off meander. Where Norderelbe and Süderelbe used to reunite, at kilometre 634 there is a bay called the Mühlenberger Loch. This marks the beginning of the section of the Unterelbe which called the Niederelbe. After leaving Hamburg it forms the border between Lower Saxony and Schleswig-Holstein, again. The end it defined by the Kugelbake in Cuxhaven at kilometre 727.73. It continues further into the Wadden Sea as the Außenelbe, where it passes the Hamburg islands Scharhörn and Nigehörn.

== See also ==
- List of rivers of Hamburg
- List of rivers of Lower Saxony
- List of rivers of Schleswig-Holstein
