= Süderelbe =

River in Germany

Coordinates: 53.5021°N 9.9427°E

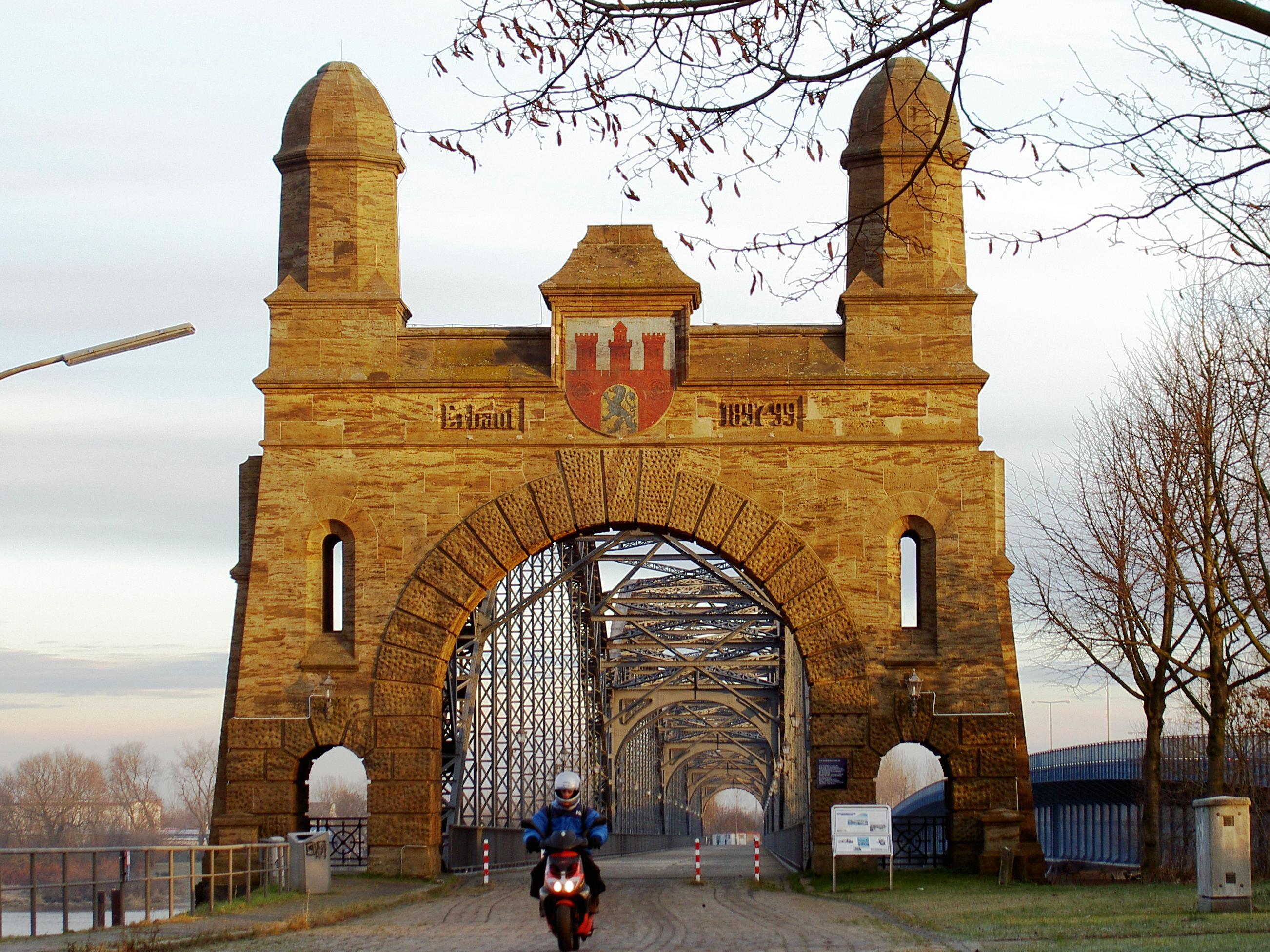
- Alte Harburger Elbbrücke (South portal)

Location
- Country: Germany
- State: Hamburg

Basin features
- River system: Elbe

The Süderelbe (German: ['zyːdɐˌʔɛlbə]) (Southern Elbe) is the biggest anabranch of the Unterelbe river in the area which is now the Port of Hamburg, Germany. Its natural flow path was redirected through the Köhlbrand.

== See also ==
- List of bridges in Hamburg
- List of rivers of Hamburg
