= Uhlenhorst =

Administrative division in Hamburg, Germany

- Quarter of Hamburg
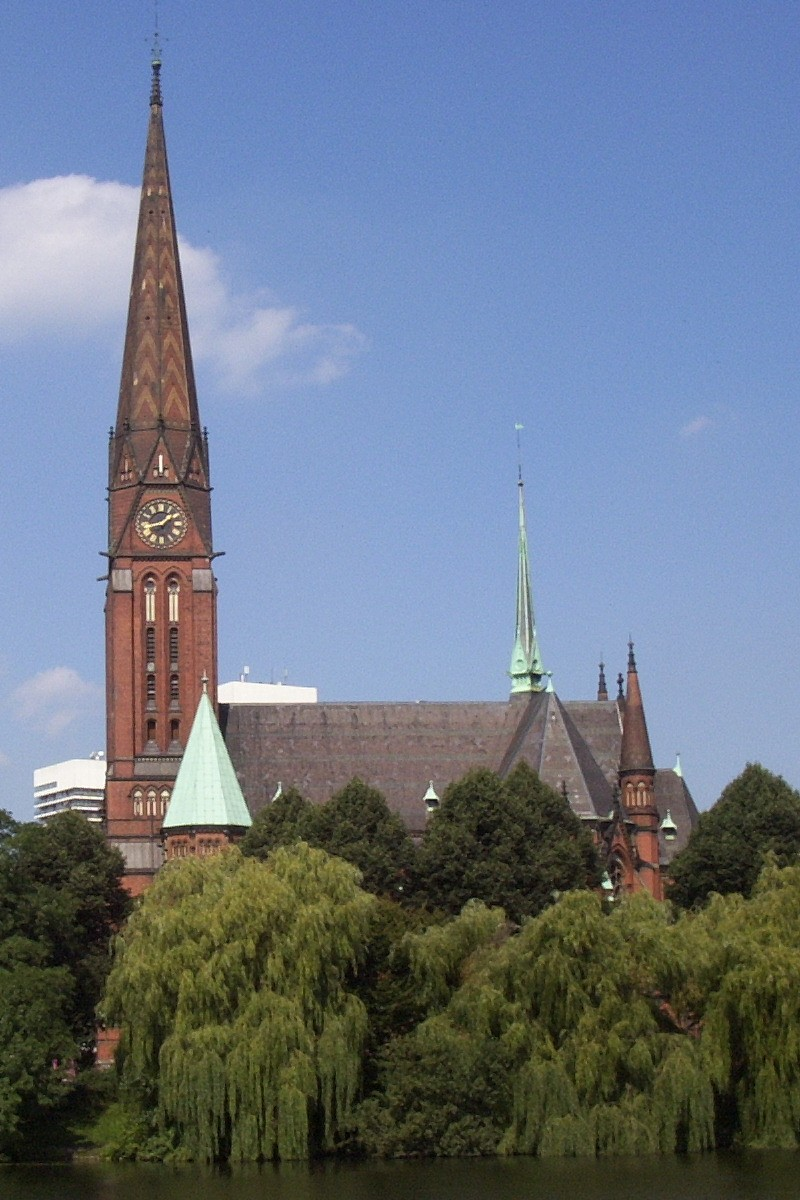

- Location of Uhlenhorst within Hamburg
- Interactive map of Uhlenhorst
- Location within Germany Location within Hamburg
- Coordinates: 53°34′17″N 10°00′46″E
- Country: Germany
- State: Hamburg
- City: Hamburg
- Borough: Hamburg-Nord

Area
  - Total: 2.2 km^{2} (0.85 sq mi)

Population (2024-12-31)
  - Total: 19,251
  - Density: 8,800/km^{2} (23,000/sq mi)
- Time zone: UTC+01:00 (CET)
  - Summer (DST): UTC+02:00 (CEST)

Uhlenhorst (German: [ˈuːlənˌhɔʁst]) is a quarter of Hamburg, Germany in the Hamburg-Nord borough.
