= Von dem Berge =

German noble family

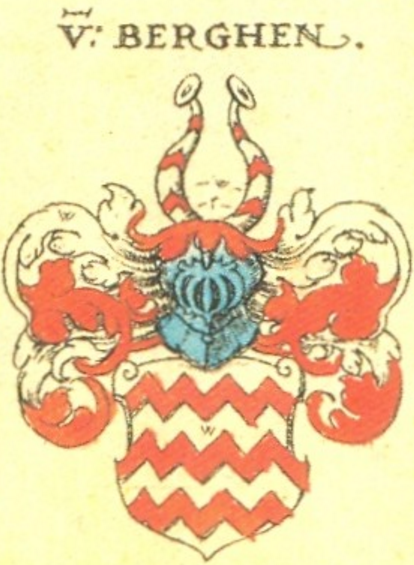
Coat of arms of the von dem Berge family

Von dem Berge was a German noble family from the Principality of Lüneburg in present-day Lower Saxony, Germany. The family held various estates across northern Germany until its extinction in the early 17th century.

== History ==
While the exact date and circumstances of their investiture is unknown, documentary evidence of their noble status extends as far back as the 13th century. The family was previously believed to have consisted of two separate branches: von dem Berge and de Monte. However, archival and diplomatic evidence shows these were in fact one and the same lineage. The name appeared as de Monte in Latin documents and von dem Berge in German ones.

More than thirty family members are known to have held the hereditary titles of Erbschenk (hereditary cup-bearer) and Erbküchenmeister (hereditary kitchen master) at the princely court of Lüneburg.

== Notable members ==
- Two of the earliest known individuals from the family were the brothers Segebandus and Thidericus de Monte, mentioned in 1224 in the records of Lüneburg.
- Several members of the family served as abbots. The earliest example of this is Abbot Lüder, Abbot of the Monastery of St. Michael in Lüneburg in 1282.
- In 1460, Abbot Boldewin (née von dem Berge) commissioned a fortified residence at Lindhorst for his brother Dietrich von dem Berge.
- Fritz von dem Berge, who died in 1540, was buried beneath an elaborate gravestone in the Church of St. Mauritius in Hittfeld.

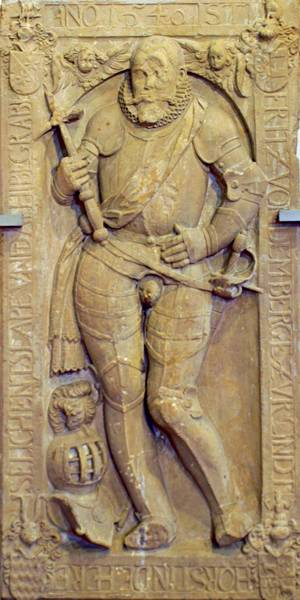

- His grandson, also named Fritz von dem Berge (1560–1623), served as a military commander in Bleckede. He donated pulpits to the Church of St. Martin in Breselenz and the Church of St Jacobi in Bleckede. He is also commemorated with a statue in Bleckede, where he is regarded as a local hero for his role in the diverting the course of the River Elbe. However, modern historical research has questioned this attribution.

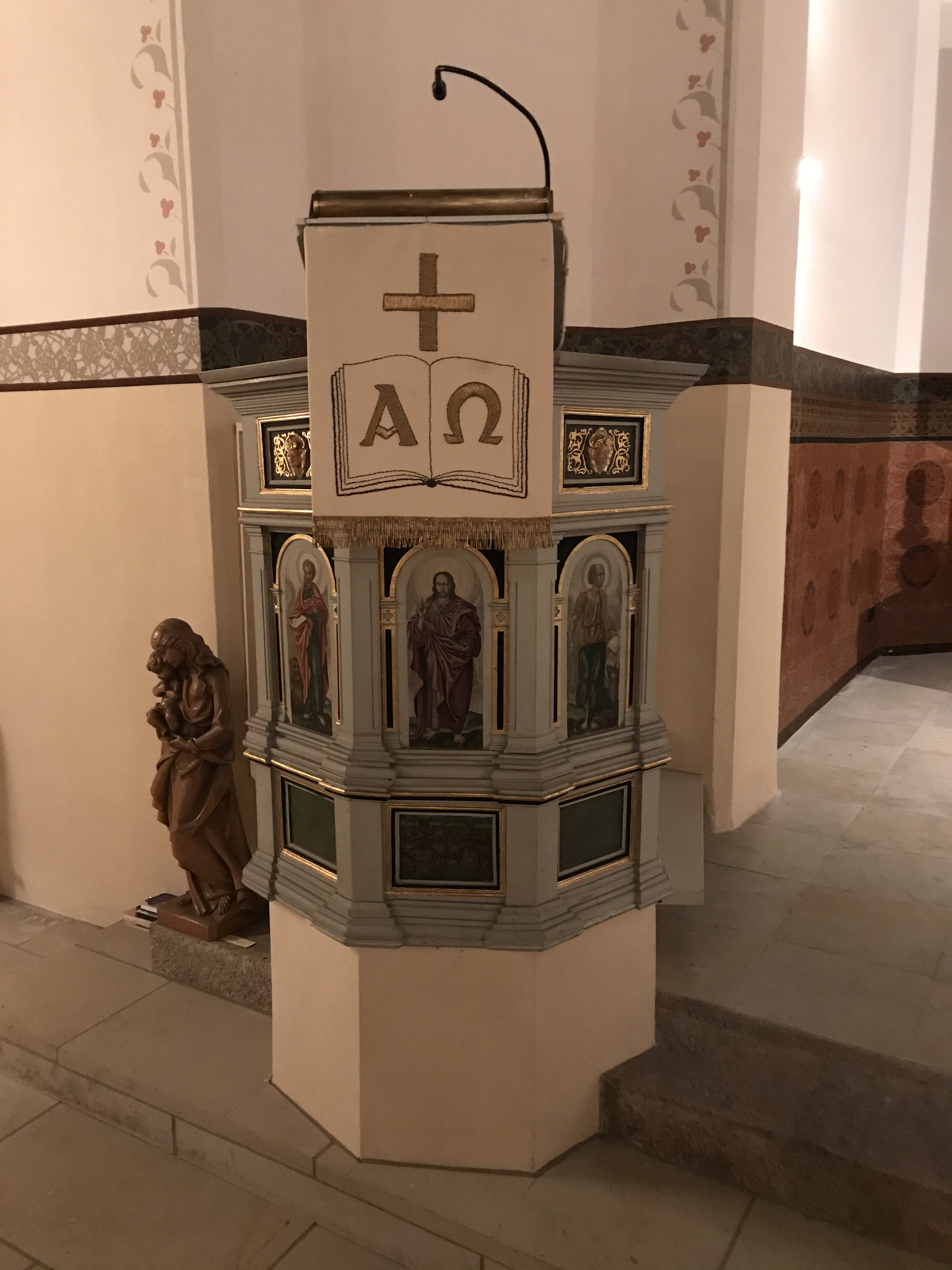
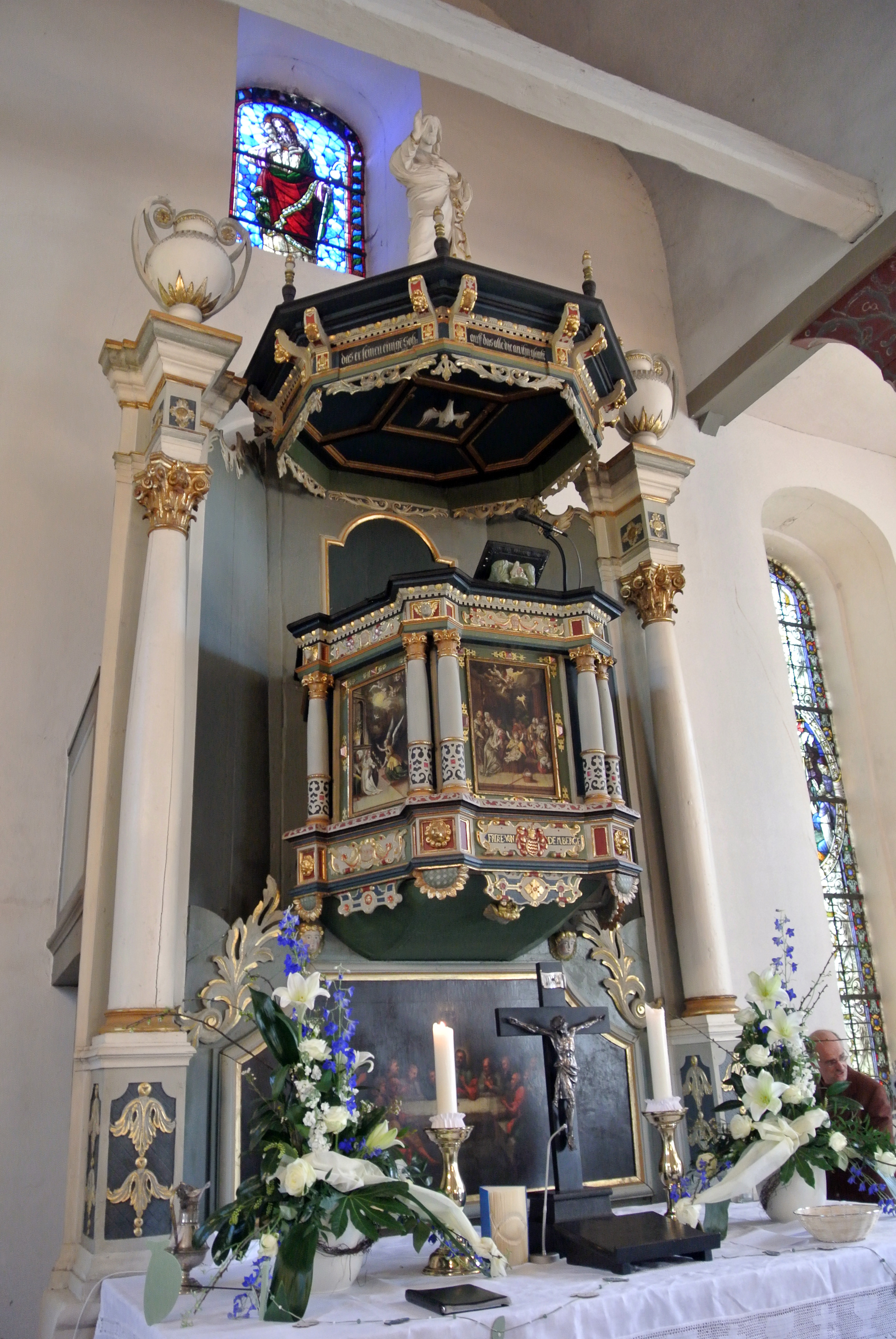

== Extinction of the line ==
The male line of the family ended with the death of Fritz von dem Berge in 1623. His estates were inherited by descendants of the Maltzahn family through his sister, Ilse von dem Berge, who had married Dietrich III von Maltzahn (1552–1599) auf Ulrichshausen aus Grubenhagen.

== Properties ==
The von dem Berge family held several properties, including:

- Gümse – One of the family's principal properties. It was the family's main estate of a property complex they possessed in the principality of Lüneburg. It was sold in 1593 and later became the seat of Amt Gümse.
- Lindhorst (Seevetal) – A manor house where a castle was reportedly built in 1460 by Abbot Boldewin for his brother Dietrich von dem Berge. These fortifications were paid for at the monastery's expense.
- Garze (Bleckede) – A manor held by the family from the mid-15th century. After the family died out, the estate was confiscated by the Dukes of Brunswick-Lüneburg and later became the seat of Amt Garze.

== Heraldry ==
The von dem Berge coat of arms is typically described as follows:

- Shield: Silver field with three or four narrow, pointed red beams.
- Crest: Two buffalo horns, each adorned with pointed red beams.
- Mantling: Silver and red.
- Torse: Yes, but no details available.

The exact design of their full coat of arms is lost, but versions can still be seen on Fritz von dem Berge's gravestone in Hittfeld and on the pulpits of St Martin's Church in Breselenz and the Church of St Jacobi in Bleckede. In all three places four pointed beams are counted.
