= Tanja (ship, 1959) =

German ferry ship

Coordinates: 53°14′6.33″N 10°53′31.25″E

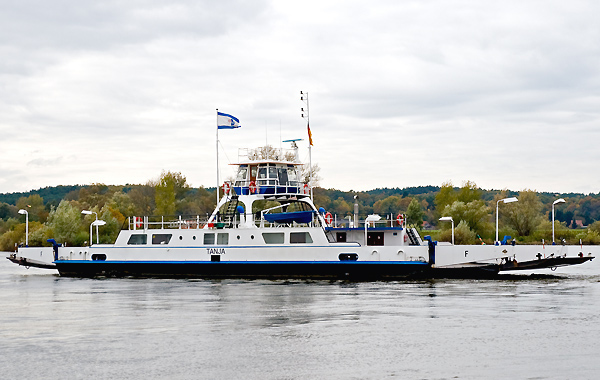
- Darchau Ferry

History
- Name: Tanja (Darchau ferry)
- Route: Neu Darchau–Darchau (Elbe, Lower Saxony)
- Builder: Scheepswerf en Machinefabriek H. J. Koopman, Dordrecht, Netherlands
- Launched: 1959
- In service: 1993
- Status: in active service, as of 2010

General characteristics
- Type: Double-ended ferry
- Length: 45.9 m (150 ft 7 in)
- Beam: 12.1 m (39 ft 8 in)
- Draught: 0.7 m (2 ft 4 in)
- Propulsion: 2 × Scania AB diesel engines; 2 × Voith Schneider Propellers
- Speed: 14 knots (26 km/h; 16 mph)
- Capacity: 140 tonnes / 200 passengers

The Tanja is an automobile ferry, built in 1959, that currently operates the Neu Darchau to Darchau Ferry across the Elbe river in Germany. The ship has previously carried the names Waal and Wijkse Veer.

== General information ==
The ferry itself was built in 1959 at the Scheepswerf en Machinefabriek H. J. Koopman in Dordrecht, Netherlands, and placed in service on 26 March 1960 as the Waal. From 1960 to 1974 it was operated by the Dutch municipality of Tiel. In 1974 the boat was taken over by the municipality of Wijk bij Duurstede. It ran there under the name of Wijkse Veer until 1993. Since 1993 the boat has been run as the Tanja Ferry by the municipality of Neu Darchau.

The current Tanja replaced a smaller double-ended ferry of the same name that became the reserve ferry in Neu Darchau in 1997.

== Technical information ==
Tanja is an open, double-ended ferry with ramps at both ends. The wheelhouse is located on a bridge in the centre above the vehicle deck. The ferry has a total length of 45.9 metres, a width of 12.1 metres and a draught of 0.7 metres. Its usable transport length is 30.9 metres, its carrying capacity 140 tonnes. Up to 21 vehicles or 200 passengers may be carried. The highest weight for a single vehicle is 40 tonnes. The ferry has a top speed of 14 km/h. It is powered by two Scania diesel engines that each drive a Voith Schneider Propeller.
