= Elbtalaue =

Samtgemeinde in Lower Saxony

- Samtgemeinde
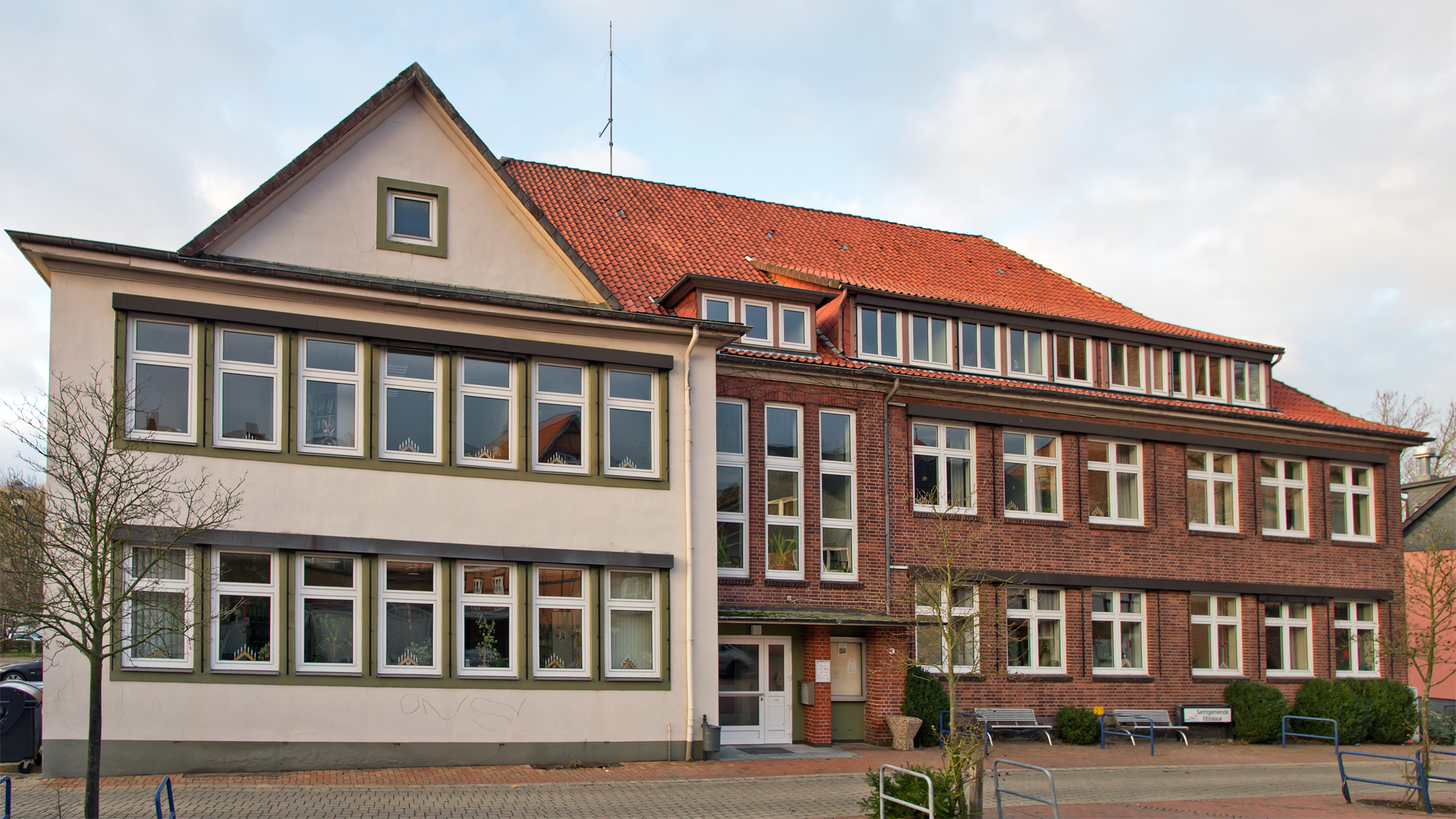
- Administration building in Dannenberg

- Location of Elbtalaue within Lüchow-Dannenberg district
- Interactive map of Elbtalaue
- Location within Germany Location within Lower Saxony
- Coordinates: 53°06′N 11°06′E
- Country: Germany
- State: Lower Saxony
- District: Lüchow-Dannenberg
- Seat: Dannenberg
- Subdivisions: 10 municipalities

Area
  - Total: 424.53 km^{2} (163.91 sq mi)

Population (2025-12-31)
  - Total: 19,921
  - Density: 46.925/km^{2} (121.53/sq mi)
- Time zone: UTC+01:00 (CET)
  - Summer (DST): UTC+02:00 (CEST)
- Website: www.elbtalaue.de

Elbtalaue is a Samtgemeinde ("collective municipality") in the district of Lüchow-Dannenberg, in Lower Saxony, Germany. Its seat is in the town Dannenberg. Actually, the word Elbtalaue means "Elbe floodplain" and describes a spatially not sharply defined region around the river's middle reaches in northern Germany.

The Samtgemeinde Elbtalaue consists of the following municipalities:

1. Damnatz
2. Dannenberg
3. Göhrde
4. Gusborn
5. Hitzacker
6. Jameln
7. Karwitz
8. Langendorf
9. Neu Darchau
10. Zernien
