= Schwingesperrwerk =

Flood control barrier in Germany

Coordinates: 53°37′29″N 9°30′51″E

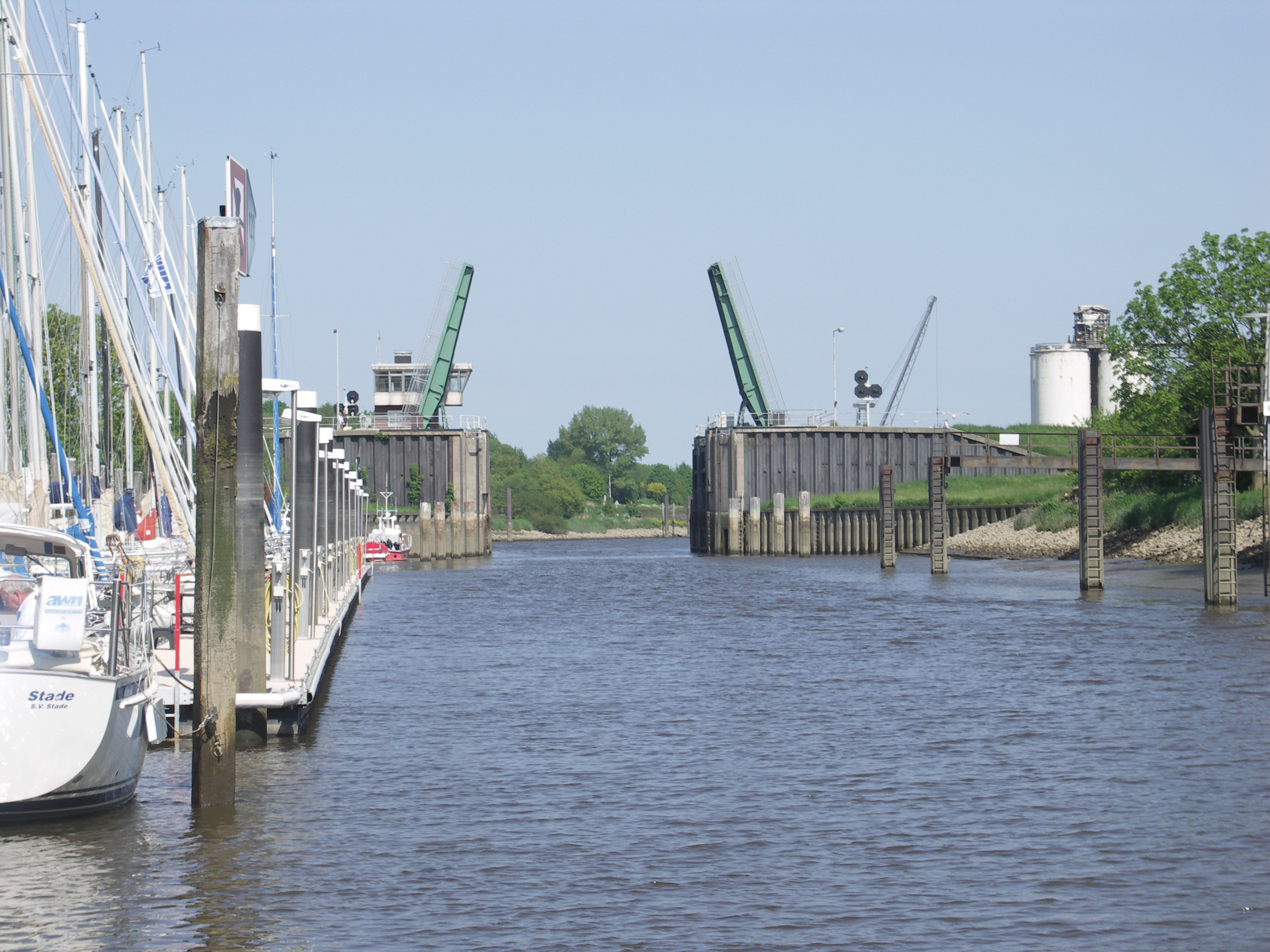
Schwingesperrwerk during low tide, View towards the mouth of the Schwinge

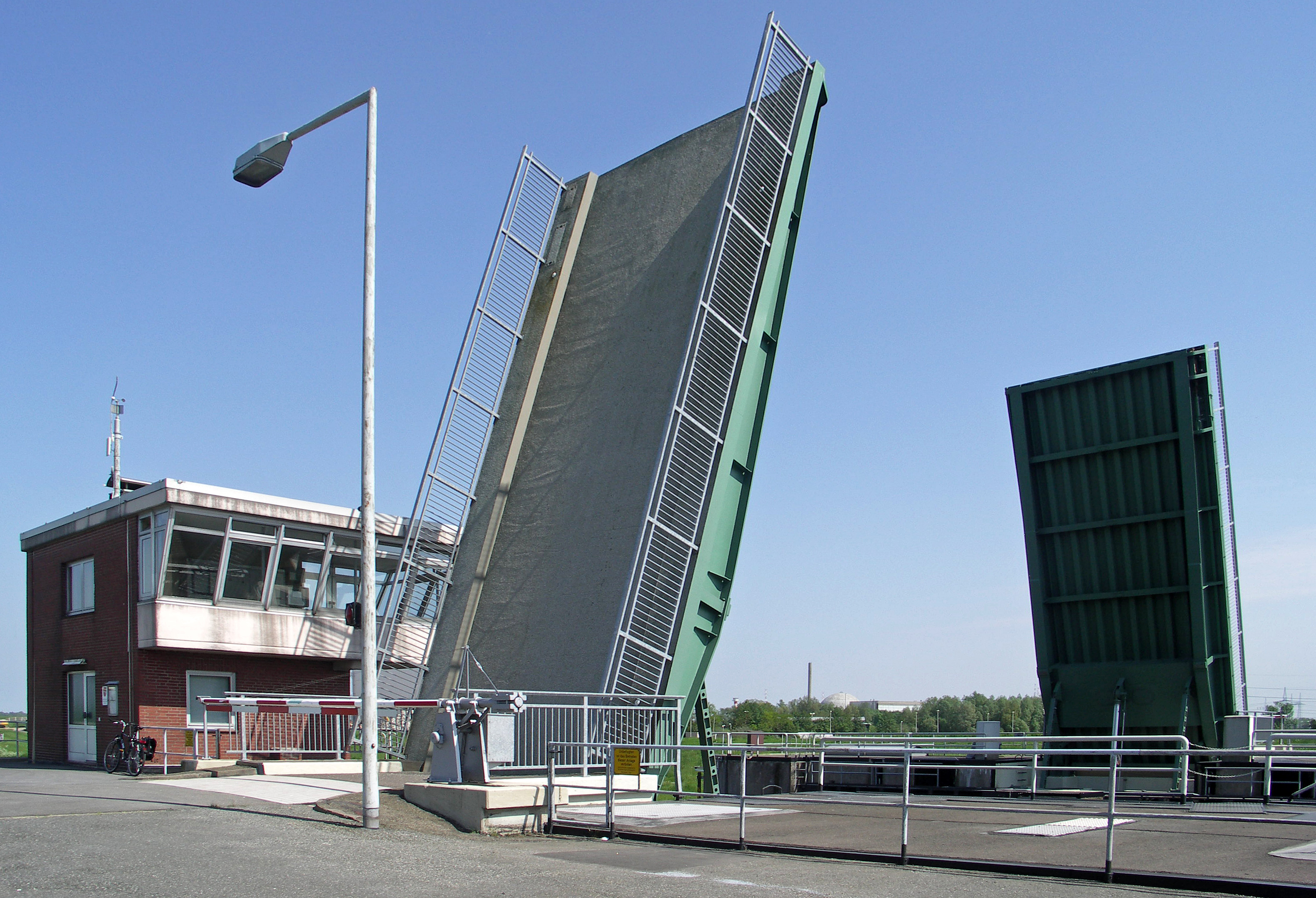
The bascule bridge of the barrage is out of order.

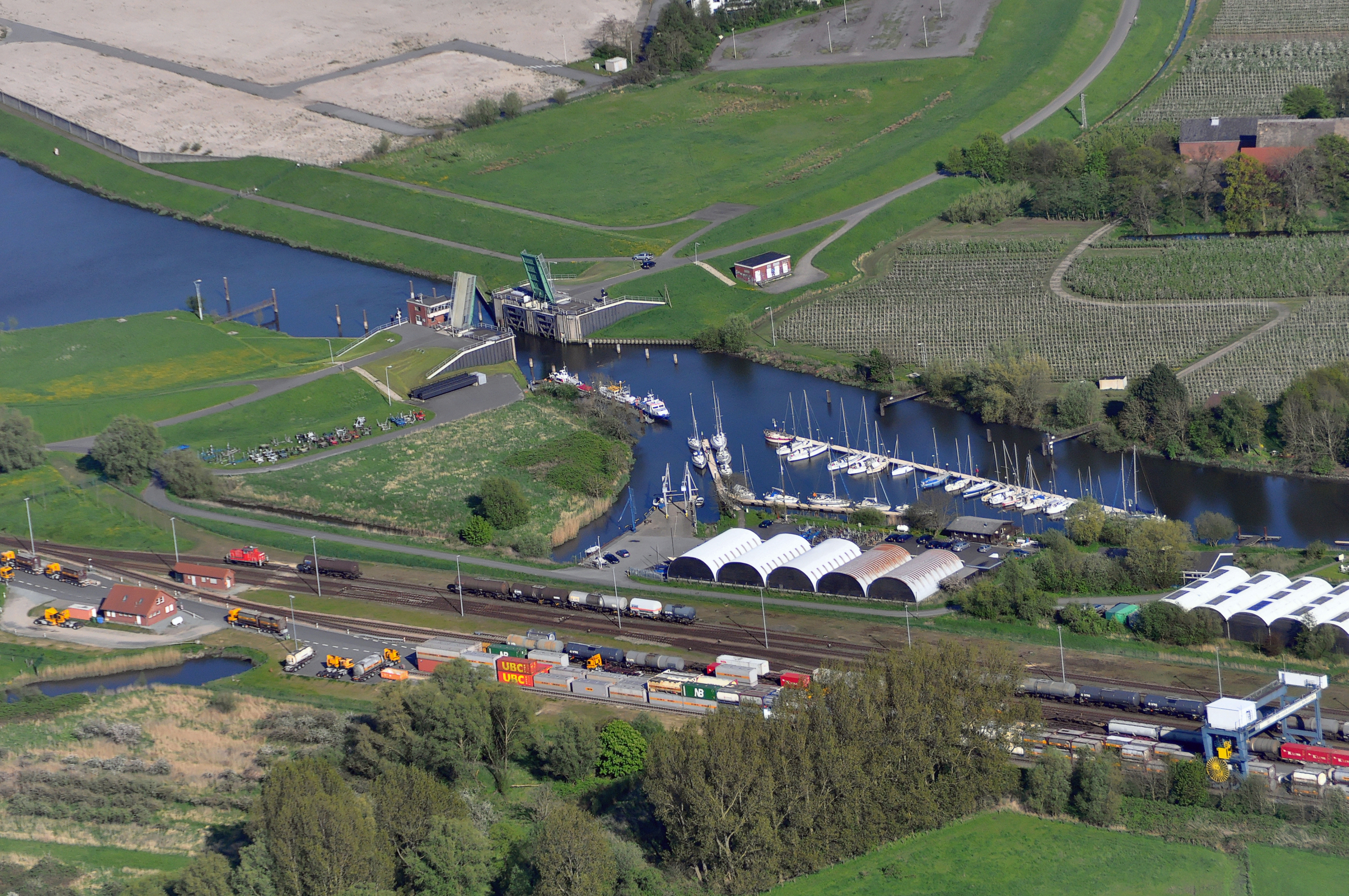
The bascule bridge of the barrage is out of order.

The Schwingesperrwerk is a man-made movable barrier located on the Schwinge at its confluence with the Elbe near Stade, Germany. It is part of the flood control program for the Lower Elbe tidewater region, from the weir in Geesthacht to the mouth of the Elbe where it flows into the North Sea. Engineers constructed the Schwingesperrwerk after a storm surge caused severe floods in the region in 1962.

Built between June 1969 to August 1971, the barrier protects the area surrounding the Schwinge. The construction costs of the barrier amounted to about 7.5 million Euro, in 2013 currency. Seven thousand cubic metres of reinforced concrete, 900 tons of rebar steel and 1,200 tons of steel sheet pilings were used in the construction.

The structure is 34 metres wide and equally deep. The shipping bay, which has a clearance width of 16 metres, can be closed with two double gates. Their cill lies at 4.5m below normal (NN), while the top of the gates is 7.6m above normal. The gates close at water levels of 2.4 metres above normal. Spanning the barrier is a double-leaf bascule bridge, more commonly known as a draw bridge, which is out of order.

The barrier is managed by the executive agency Stade of the Lower Saxon State Department for Waterway, Coastal and Nature Conservation.
