= Neu Darchau - Darchau ferry =

Ferry route across the Elbe river in Germany

Coordinates: 53.235132°N 10.8917°E

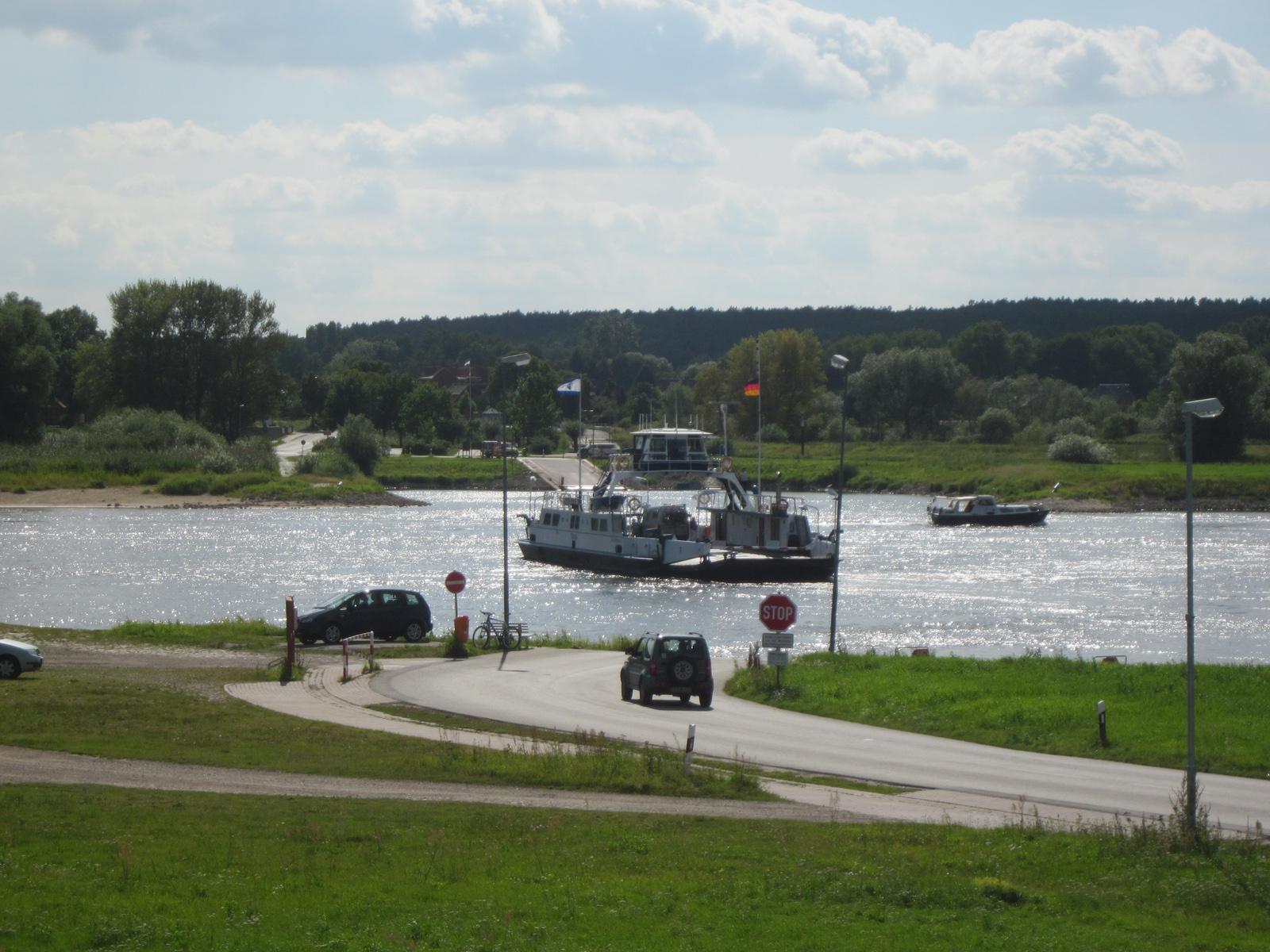
The current Tanja operating the ferry in 2012

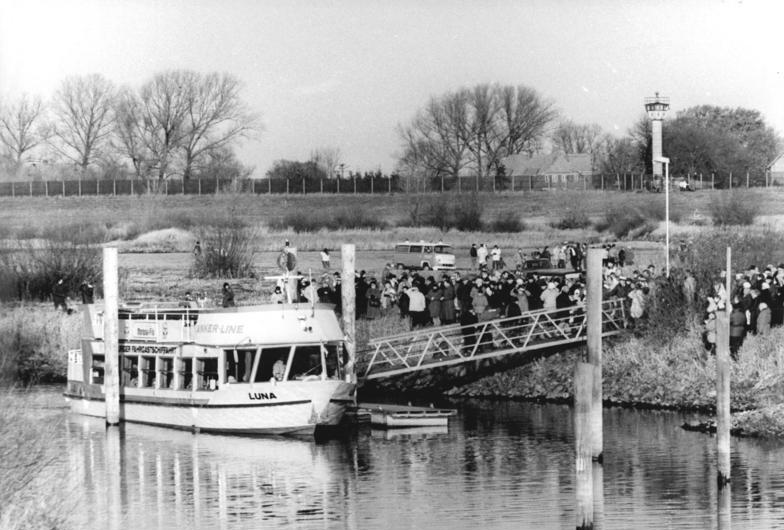
Luna inaugurating the ferry in 1989 with East German border fences and watch towers remaining in the background.

The Neu Darchau to Darchau ferry is a ferry route across the Elbe river in Germany. It crosses between the town of Neu Darchau, in the district of Lüchow-Dannenberg, and Darchau, in the municipality of Amt Neuhaus and district of Lüneburg. Both terminals are in the state of Lower Saxony, about 80 kilometres (50 mi) southeast of the city of Hamburg.

Ferries have existed on this stretch of the Elbe since historic times, with many farms on the south bank having pasture on the north side of the river. However after the Second World War and the partition of Germany, the Amt Neuhaus area on the north bank found itself in East Germany, whilst the south bank was in West Germany. The Elbe forming a closed frontier between the two and it was only after the Wende, in 1989, that travel across the river became possible again. Initially the demand was satisfied by the chartered passenger ferry Luna, but in 1990 the municipality of Neu Darchau purchased a ferry, named Tanja, and commenced vehicle ferry service. In 1993 the first Tanja was replaced by the current Tanja.

The ferry runs from 05:00 to 21:00 on Monday tr Saturday, and from 09:00 to 21:00 on Sundays and public holidays. During operating hours the ferry operates a round trip every 10 minutes, with a journey time of approximately 5 minutes.

A road bridge over the Elbe between Neu Darchau and Darchau, which would replace the ferry, has been proposed and is in the initial planning stages.
