= Rethe =

River in Germany

Coordinates: 53.5175°N 9.9413°E

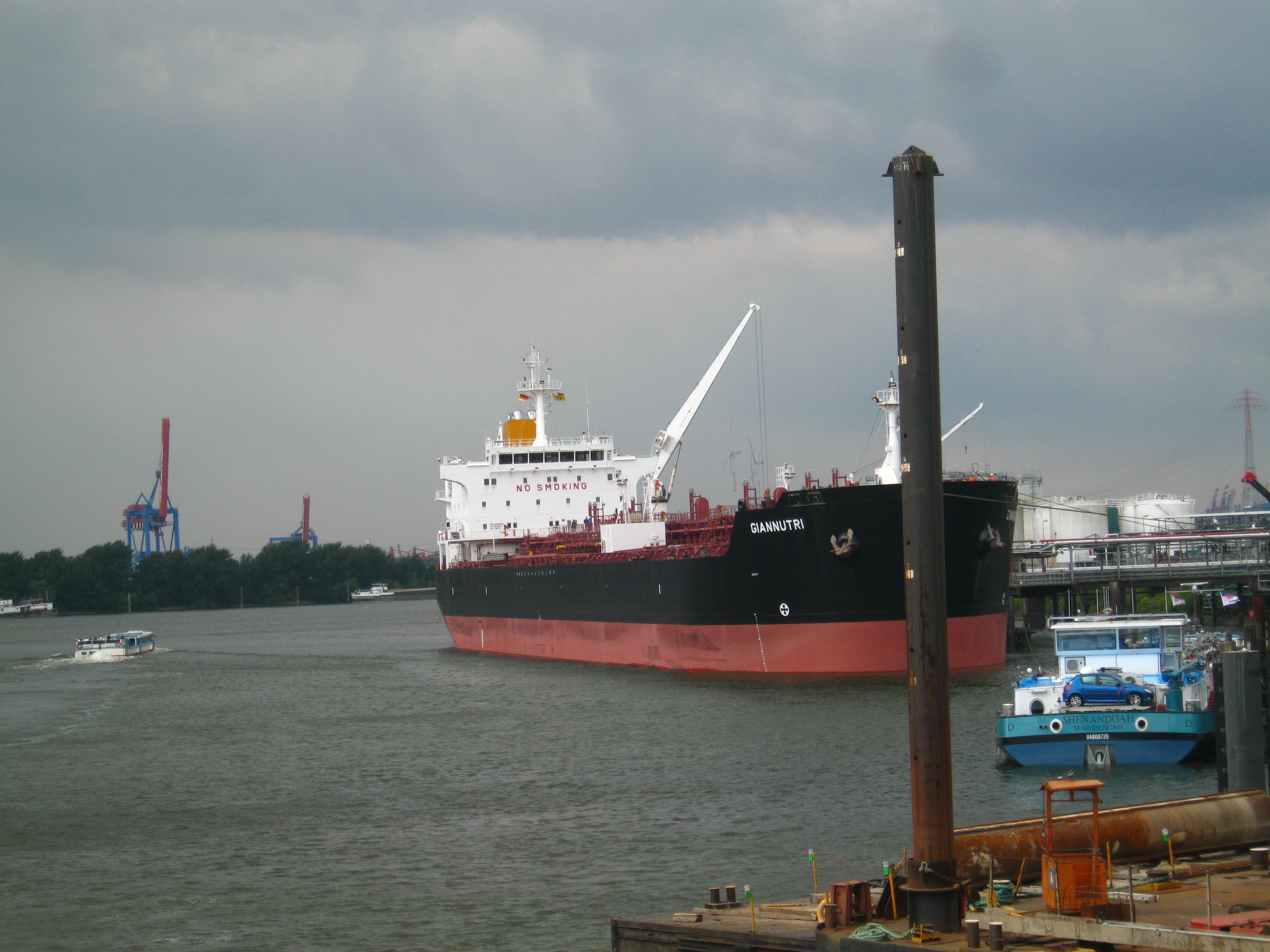

Location
- Country: Germany
- States: Hamburg

Physical characteristics
- Source
  - location: Reiherstieg
- Mouth
  - location: Köhlbrand
- Length: 2.4 km (1.5 mi)

Basin features
- River system: Elbe

The Rethe is a waterway in the Port of Hamburg, Germany.

It is located in Wilhelmsburg between the islands Hohe Schaar and Neuhof. It connects the Reiherstieg basin with the Köhlbrand.

It is bridged by the Rethe Lift Bridge.

== See also ==
- List of rivers of Hamburg
