= Dove Elbe =

River in Germany

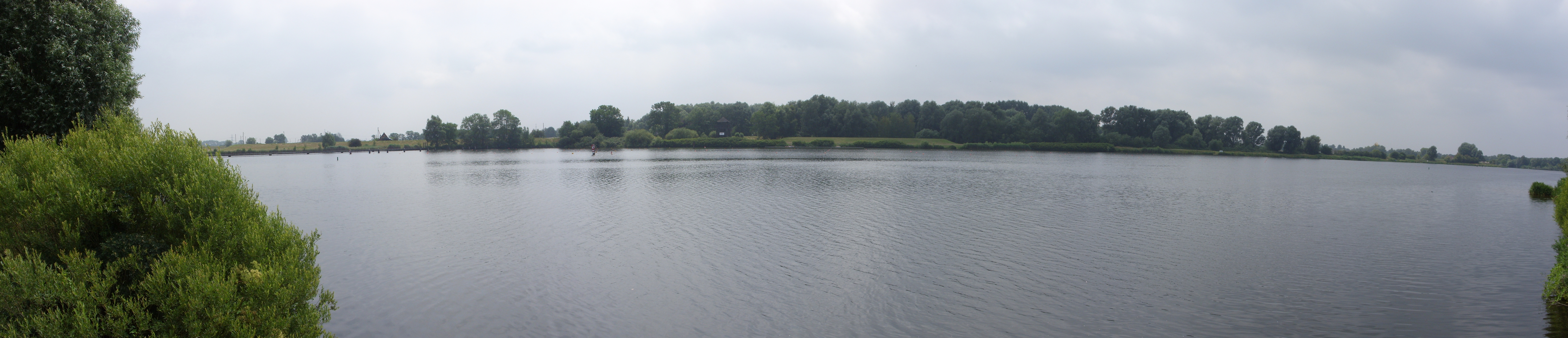

Location
- Country: Germany
- State: Hamburg

Physical characteristics
- Mouth
  - location: Norderelbe
  - coordinates: 53.5061°N 10.0595°E
- Length: 18 km (11 mi)

Basin features
- Progression: Elbe→ North Sea
- Tributaries
  - left: Gose Elbe

The Dove Elbe (German pronunciation: [ˈdoːvə ˈʔɛlbə]) is a closed anabranch of the Unterelbe, the lower part of the river Elbe (near Hamburg, Germany).

The inflow has been blocked by a dike since 1438. The lower end was shortened by a redirection of the Norderelbe in 1579.

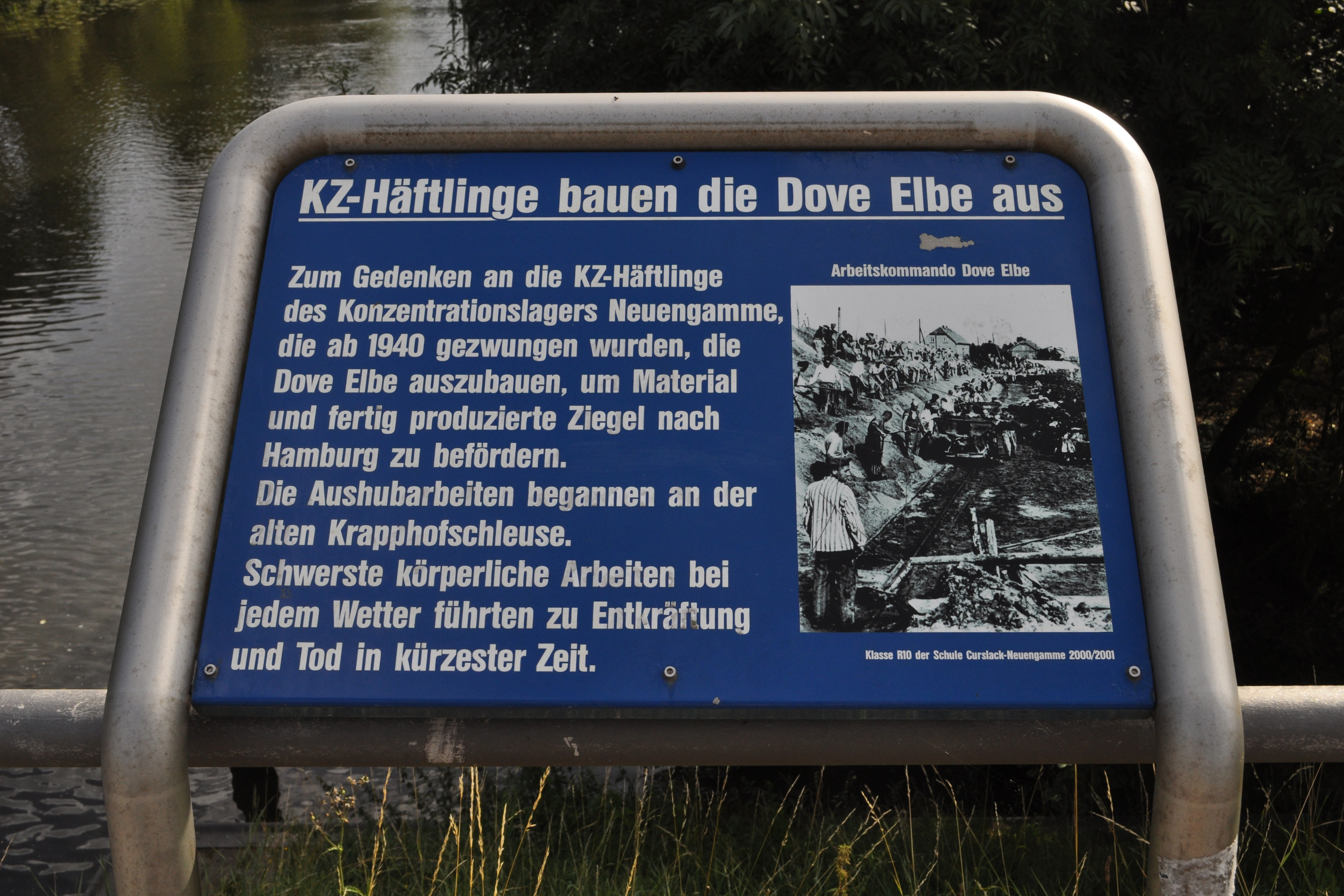
Memorial plaque with information on forced labor around the Dove Elbe in World War II.

Before the Neuengammer Blaue Brücke (lit. Blue Bridge), there is the Neuengammer branch canal going off to the left. From 1940 to 1942, prisoners of the Neuengamme concentration camp had to dig this canal and widen the Dove Elbe from here. The bricks produced in the camp's clinker factory were to be transported to Hamburg in barges along the waterway created in this way.

Its Low German name translates to "deaf Elbe"; it is etymologically unrelated to the bird.

== See also ==
- List of rivers of Hamburg
