= Medemsand =

Coordinates: 53°54′N 8°48′E

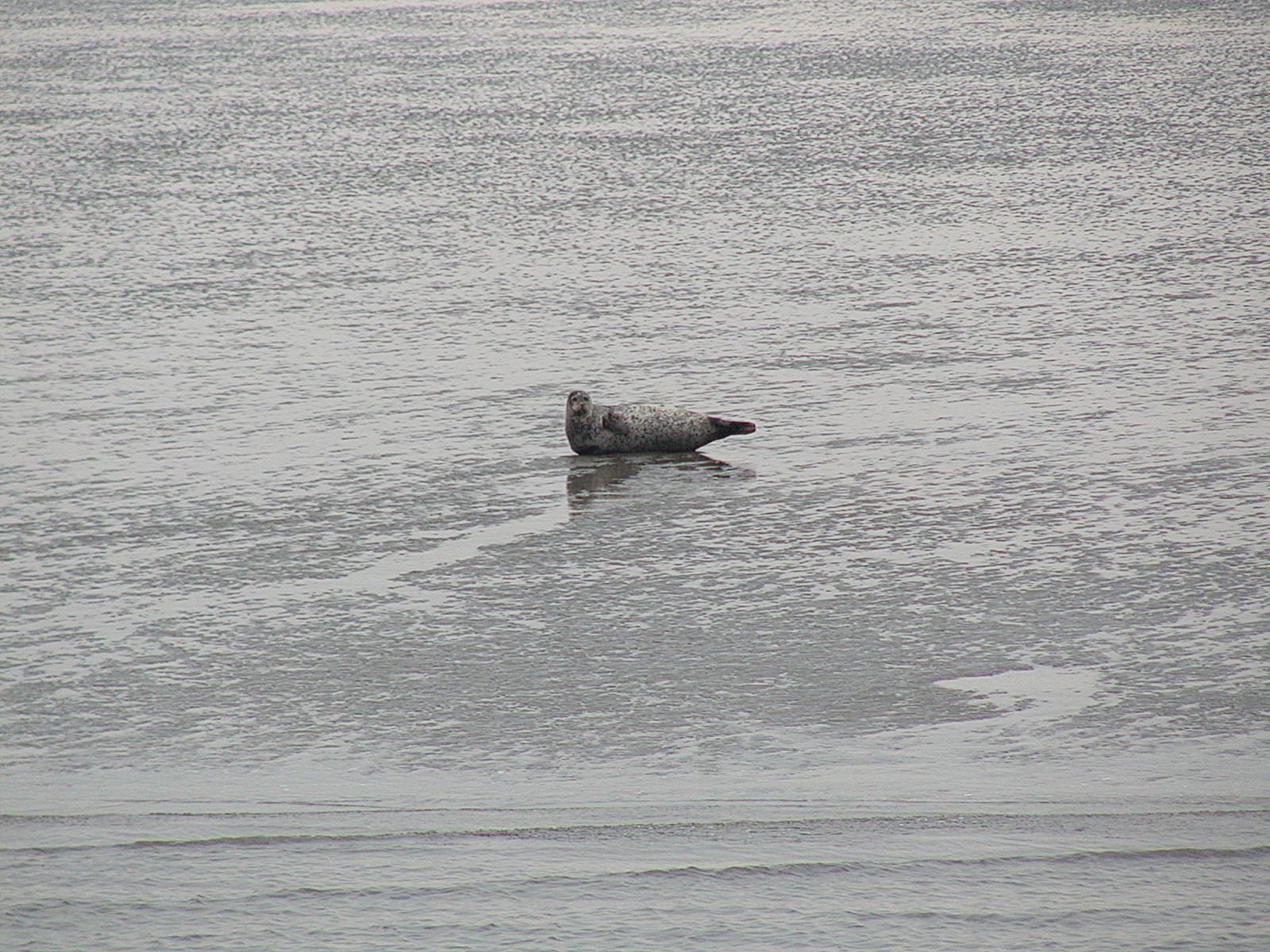
A Harbor seal on the Medemsand at low tide, 2007.

Medemsand island was a small island of Germany in the mouth of the Elbe on the Schleswig-Holstein coast opposite Otterndorf (Lower Saxony), where the Medem river flows into the Elbe. It was also known locally as Flak island. The island belonged to the district of Dithmarschen and was managed by the Brunsbüttel Water Management Office. It was eroded due to water flow and no longer exists today.

The remnants of the island remain just below the surface and pose an obstacle to maritime traffic, as a shipping lane passes near it.

Shortly before World War II, Medemsand Island was artificially built up using sand, piles, and basalt blocks, and expanded into an advanced anti-aircraft station in the event of possible air raids on Hamburg, with anti-aircraft guns and bunkers being installed.
