= Rogätz =

- Municipality
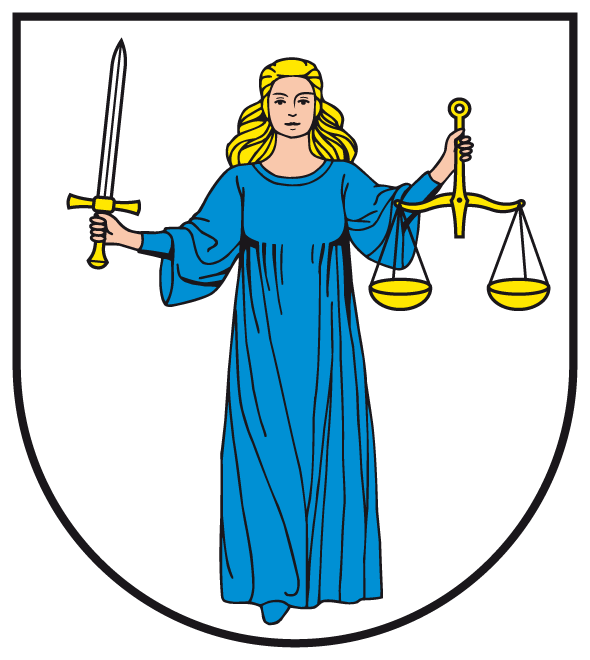
- Coat of arms

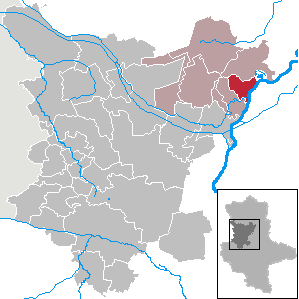
- Location of Rogätz within Börde district
- Interactive map of Rogätz
- Location within Germany Location within Saxony-Anhalt
- Coordinates: 52°19′N 11°46′E
- Country: Germany
- State: Saxony-Anhalt
- District: Börde
- Municipal assoc.: Elbe-Heide

Government
  - Mayor (2018–25): Wolfgang Großmann

Area
  - Total: 23.87 km^{2} (9.22 sq mi)
- Elevation: 39 m (128 ft)

Population (2025-12-31)
  - Total: 2,167
  - Density: 90.78/km^{2} (235.1/sq mi)
- Time zone: UTC+01:00 (CET)
  - Summer (DST): UTC+02:00 (CEST)
- Postal codes: 39326
- Dialling codes: 039208
- Vehicle registration: BK, BÖ
- Website: www.rogaetz.de

Rogätz (German: [ʁoˈɡɛːts]) is a municipality in the Börde district in Saxony-Anhalt, Germany. It is located on the left bank of the river Elbe, and is linked to Schartau by the Rogätz Ferry.
