= Langendorf, Lower Saxony =

Langendorf
- Municipality
- Location of Langendorf within Lüchow-Dannenberg district
- Interactive map of Langendorf
- Location within Germany Location within Lower Saxony
- Coordinates: 53°06′N 11°15′E
- Country: Germany
- State: Lower Saxony
- District: Lüchow-Dannenberg
- Municipal assoc.: Elbtalaue
- Subdivisions: 7 Ortsteile

Government
  - Mayor: Harald Hintzmann

Area
  - Total: 41.06 km^{2} (15.85 sq mi)
- Elevation: 23 m (75 ft)

Population (2025-12-31)
  - Total: 674
  - Density: 16.4/km^{2} (42.5/sq mi)
- Time zone: UTC+01:00 (CET)
  - Summer (DST): UTC+02:00 (CEST)
- Postal codes: 29484
- Dialling codes: 05865
- Vehicle registration: DAN

Langendorf (German pronunciation: [ˈlaŋəndɔʁf]) is a municipality in the district Lüchow-Dannenberg, in Lower Saxony, Germany.

== History ==
On July 1, 1972, the municipalities of Kaltenhof and Laase were integrated
