= Gusborn =

- Municipality
- Location of Gusborn within Lüchow-Dannenberg district
- Interactive map of Gusborn
- Location within Germany Location within Lower Saxony
- Coordinates: 53°05′N 11°13′E
- Country: Germany
- State: Lower Saxony
- District: Lüchow-Dannenberg
- Municipal assoc.: Elbtalaue
- Subdivisions: 6 Ortsteile

Government
  - Mayor: Hartmut Ringel

Area
  - Total: 48.3 km^{2} (18.6 sq mi)
- Elevation: 17 m (56 ft)

Population (2025-12-31)
  - Total: 1,210
  - Density: 25.1/km^{2} (64.9/sq mi)
- Time zone: UTC+01:00 (CET)
  - Summer (DST): UTC+02:00 (CEST)
- Postal codes: 29476
- Dialling codes: 05865
- Vehicle registration: DAN

Gusborn is a municipality in the district Lüchow-Dannenberg, in Lower Saxony, Germany.
