= Schwinge (Elbe) =

River in Germany

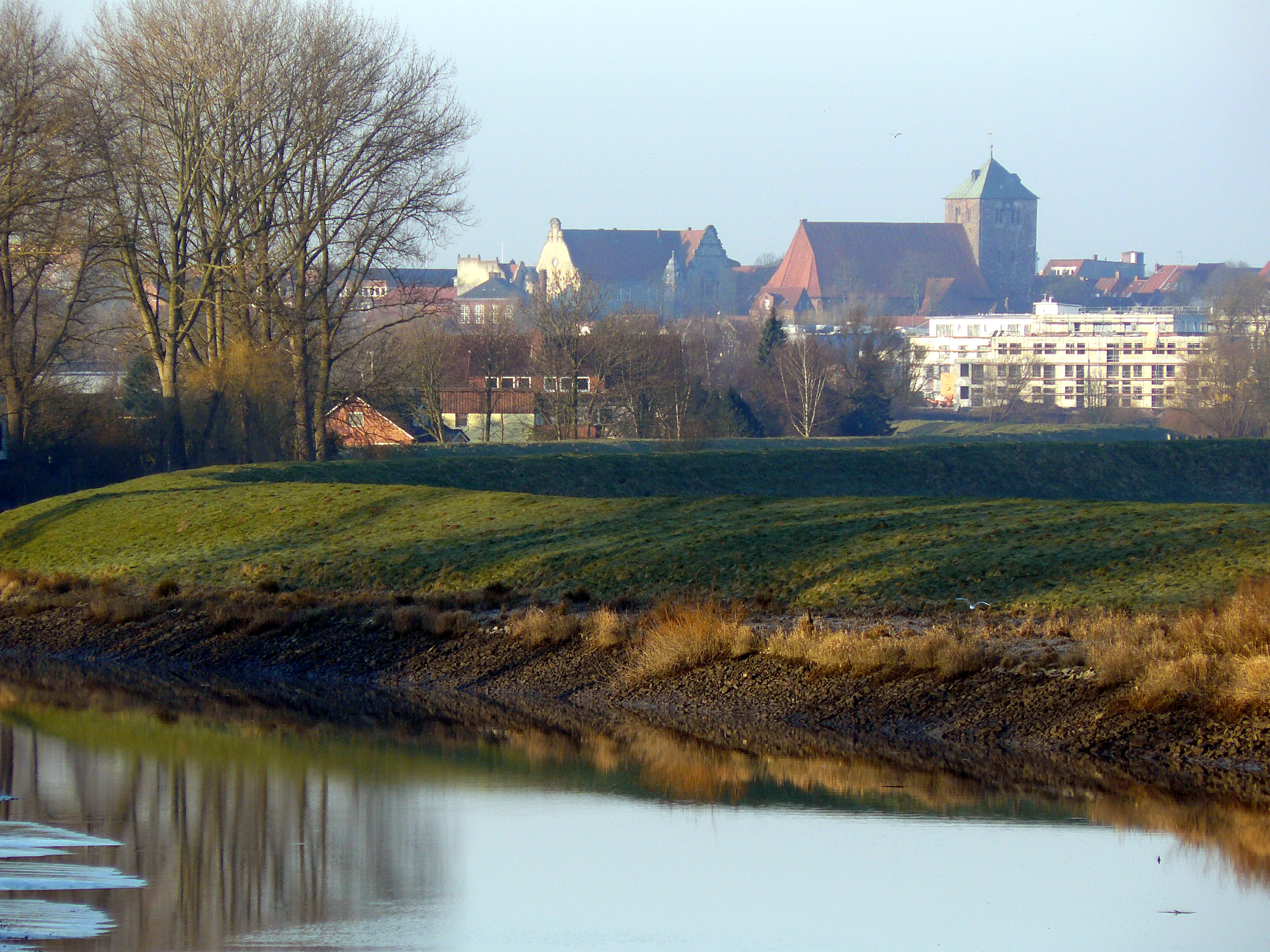
- Lower reach of the Schwinge in Spring

Location
- Country: Germany
- State: Lower Saxony

Physical characteristics
- Source
  - location: In the Hohes Moor near Mulsum (part of Kutenholz)
  - elevation: 9 m (30 ft)
- Mouth
  - location: Stadersand
  - coordinates: 53.6293°N 9.5269°E
  - elevation: 0 m (0 ft)
- Length: 31.8 km (19.8 mi)
- Basin size: 214 km^{2} (83 sq mi)

Basin features
- Progression: Elbe→ North Sea
- Tributaries
  - left: Grenzgraben, Kattenbeck, Harschenflether Wettern
  - right: Kühlhornsbach, Beverbeck, Fredenbecker Mühlenbach, Westernbeck, Steinbeck, Heidbeck, Hollerner Moorwettern

The Schwinge is a river of Lower Saxony, Germany, a left tributary of the Elbe.

The Schwinge is 31.8 kilometres (19.8 mi) long. It rises in the Hohes Moor near Mulsum (a part of Kutenholz) on the Stade Geest in the bifurcation area with the Oste. From there it flows in a largely natural, more than 20-kilometre-long (12 mi) upper reach towards Stade. Because of its very natural river scenery and its biodiversity, the floodplains of the upper reach and the meadows near Stade are protected for landscape conservation.

In Stade the ca. 1000-year-old Hanse port (Alter Hansehafen Stade) lies at the Schwinge. Here the upper reach is isolated from tides by a sluice called Salztorschleuse since 1792; the lower reach of the Schwinge, which flows into the lower Elbe north-eastern of Stade at Stadersand, begins. Because of the deepening of the Elbe the average tidal hub of the lower reach rose to 3.3 metres (11 ft), because of the backlog when the sluice gates are closed the fluctuations of the upper reach only amounts to a few decimeters. Despite the embankment the banks of the lower reach are lined with exceptional rare fresh water mudflats.

The Schwinge is a 4.6-kilometre-long (2.9 mi) federal waterway from the Elbe to the Salztorschleuse. Since the completion of the Schwingesperrwerk, a flood barrier near the mouth of the river in 1971, all places at the Schwinge are protected better against storm surges. The 16-metre-wide (52 ft) gap is closed with two gates.

From the Late Middle Ages until the 1950s the Schwinge was used for the transport of goods with smack-like ships called "Ewer". During dredging of the Schwinge and the Hansehafen countless historic artefacts were found, including famous Ulfberht swords from the 8th to 12th century. Today, however, the leisure and sports boat traffic dominates the shipping on the lower reach, the upper reach beyond Stade isn't navigable.

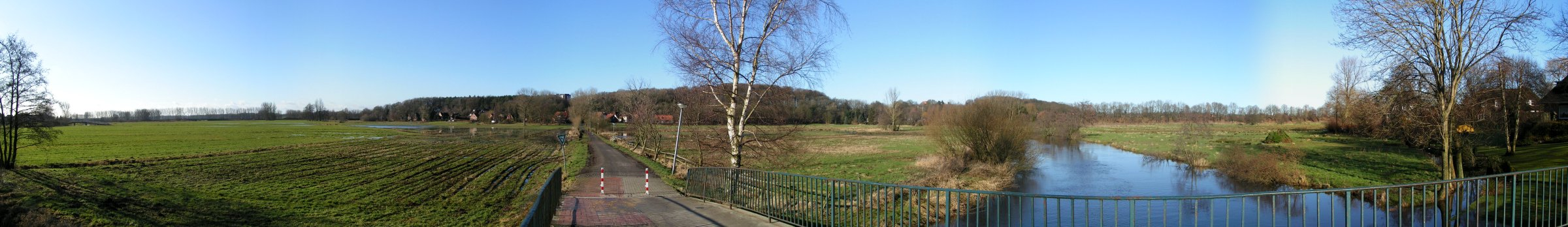
The meadows of the Schwinge near Stade during a flood. View towards the Schwarzer Berg (Stade), a geest height.

== See also ==
- List of rivers of Lower Saxony
