= Reiherstieg =

River in Germany

Coordinates: 53°28′N 9°59′E

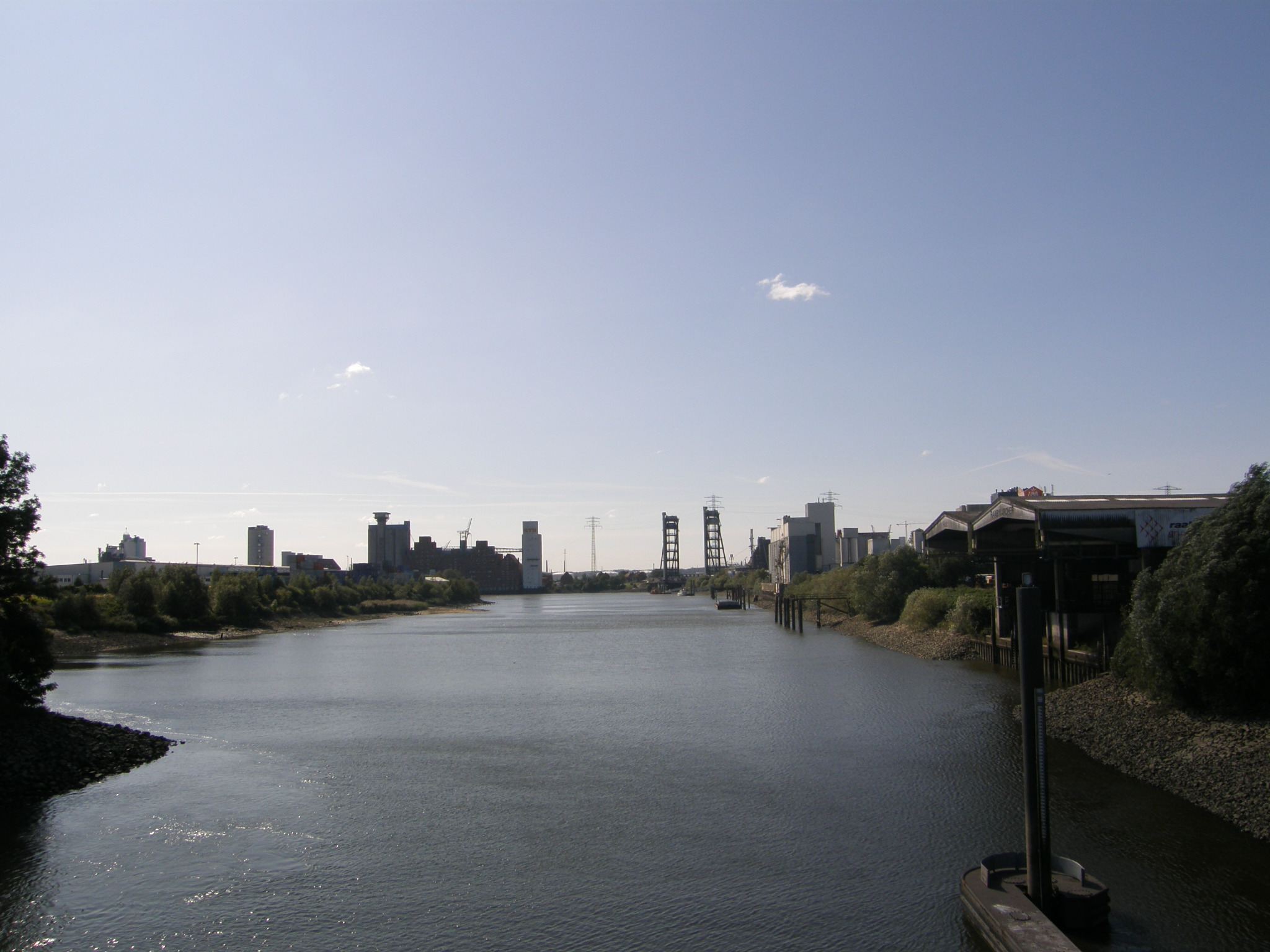

Location
- Country: Germany
- States: Hamburg

Basin features
- River system: Elbe

The Reiherstieg (German pronunciation) is an anabranch of the river Elbe in the Port of Hamburg, Germany.

It connects the Süderelbe and the Norderelbe. To avoid tideflow, its natural mouths are closed by locks, although the middle access through the Rethe basin isn't locked.

== See also ==
- List of rivers of Hamburg
