= Ferchland Grieben Ferry =

Coordinates: 52.435646°N 11.994345°E

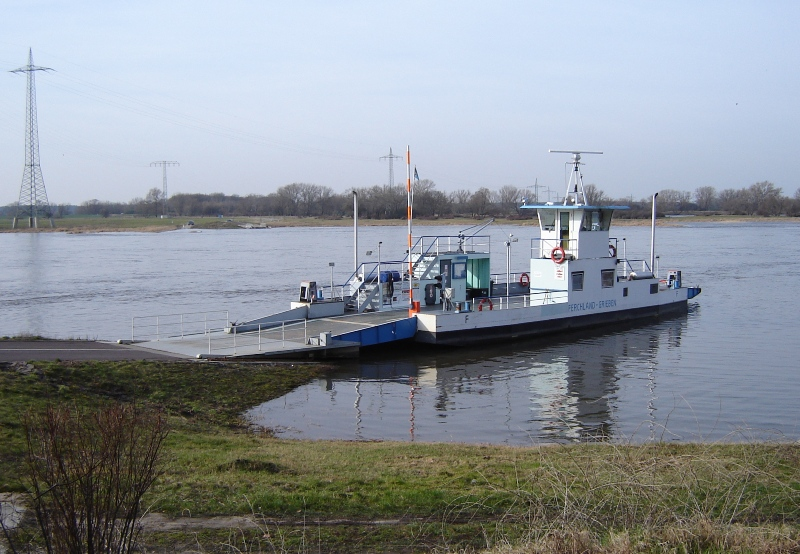
Ferchland Grieben Ferry

The Ferchland Grieben Ferry (Fähre Ferchland–Grieben) is a diesel engine ferry that crosses the Elbe river between Ferchland and Grieben in Saxony-Anhalt, Germany. It is operated by the transport company NJL.
