= Rogätz Ferry =

Coordinates: 52.313457°N 11.770585°E

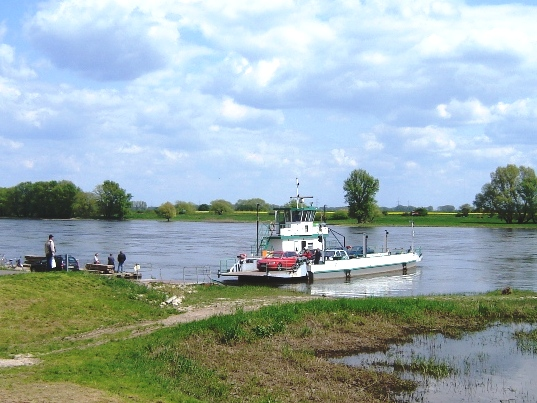
The Rogätz Ferry.

The Rogätz Ferry, also known as the Schartau Rogätz Ferry, is a ferry across the Elbe river between Schartau and Rogätz in Saxony-Anhalt, Germany.
