= Karwitz =

- Municipality
- Location of Karwitz within Lüchow-Dannenberg district
- Interactive map of Karwitz
- Location within Germany Location within Lower Saxony
- Coordinates: 53°05′N 11°01′E
- Country: Germany
- State: Lower Saxony
- District: Lüchow-Dannenberg
- Municipal assoc.: Elbtalaue
- Subdivisions: 7 Ortsteile

Government
  - Mayor: Horst Harms (CDU)

Area
  - Total: 31.65 km^{2} (12.22 sq mi)
- Elevation: 32–110 m (105–361 ft)

Population (2025-12-31)
  - Total: 732
  - Density: 23.1/km^{2} (59.9/sq mi)
- Time zone: UTC+01:00 (CET)
  - Summer (DST): UTC+02:00 (CEST)
- Postal codes: 29481
- Dialling codes: 05861
- Vehicle registration: DAN

Karwitz is a municipality in the district Lüchow-Dannenberg, in Lower Saxony, Germany.
