= Zernien =

- Municipality
- Location of Zernien within Lüchow-Dannenberg district
- Interactive map of Zernien
- Location within Germany Location within Lower Saxony
- Coordinates: 53°04′09″N 10°53′13″E
- Country: Germany
- State: Lower Saxony
- District: Lüchow-Dannenberg
- Municipal assoc.: Elbtalaue
- Subdivisions: 18 Ortsteile

Government
  - Mayor: Heinz Schulz (SPD)

Area
  - Total: 51.55 km^{2} (19.90 sq mi)
- Elevation: 100 m (330 ft)

Population (2025-12-31)
  - Total: 1,583
  - Density: 30.71/km^{2} (79.53/sq mi)
- Time zone: UTC+01:00 (CET)
  - Summer (DST): UTC+02:00 (CEST)
- Postal codes: 29499
- Dialling codes: 05863
- Vehicle registration: DAN

Zernien is a municipality in the district Lüchow-Dannenberg, in Lower Saxony, Germany.
