= Gose Elbe =

River in Germany

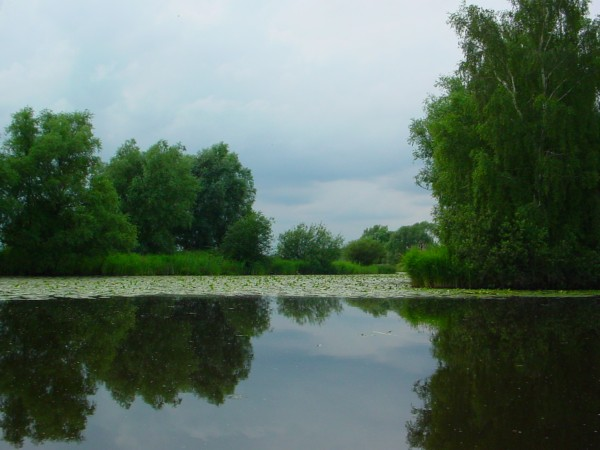
- Gose Elbe near Reitbrook.

Location
- Country: Germany
- Region: Hamburg

Physical characteristics
- Source
  - location: Kiebitzbrack pond
- Mouth
  - location: Dove Elbe
  - coordinates: 53.4811°N 10.1028°E
- Length: 15 km (9.3 mi)
- Basin size: 69 km^{2} (27 sq mi)

Basin features
- Progression: Dove Elbe→ Elbe→ North Sea

Gose Elbe (German pronunciation: [ˈɡoːzə ˈʔɛlbə]) is a river of Hamburg, Germany. It was an anabranch of the Elbe, but the inflow closed by a dike in 1390. It flows into the Dove Elbe near Reitbrook.

== See also ==
- List of rivers of Hamburg
