= Jameln =

- Municipality
- Location of Jameln within Lüchow-Dannenberg district
- Interactive map of Jameln
- Location within Germany Location within Lower Saxony
- Coordinates: 53°02′32″N 11°04′43″E
- Country: Germany
- State: Lower Saxony
- District: Lüchow-Dannenberg
- Municipal assoc.: Elbtalaue
- Subdivisions: 10 Ortsteile

Government
  - Mayor: Udo Sperling

Area
  - Total: 35.84 km^{2} (13.84 sq mi)
- Elevation: 19 m (62 ft)

Population (2025-12-31)
  - Total: 1,079
  - Density: 30.11/km^{2} (77.97/sq mi)
- Time zone: UTC+01:00 (CET)
  - Summer (DST): UTC+02:00 (CEST)
- Postal codes: 29479
- Dialling codes: 05864
- Vehicle registration: DAN

Jameln is a municipality in the district Lüchow-Dannenberg, in Lower Saxony, Germany. Jameln is part of the Samtgemeinde ("collective municipality") Elbtalaue.

The main village in the municipality is Jameln, with around 450 inhabitants.

== Settlements ==
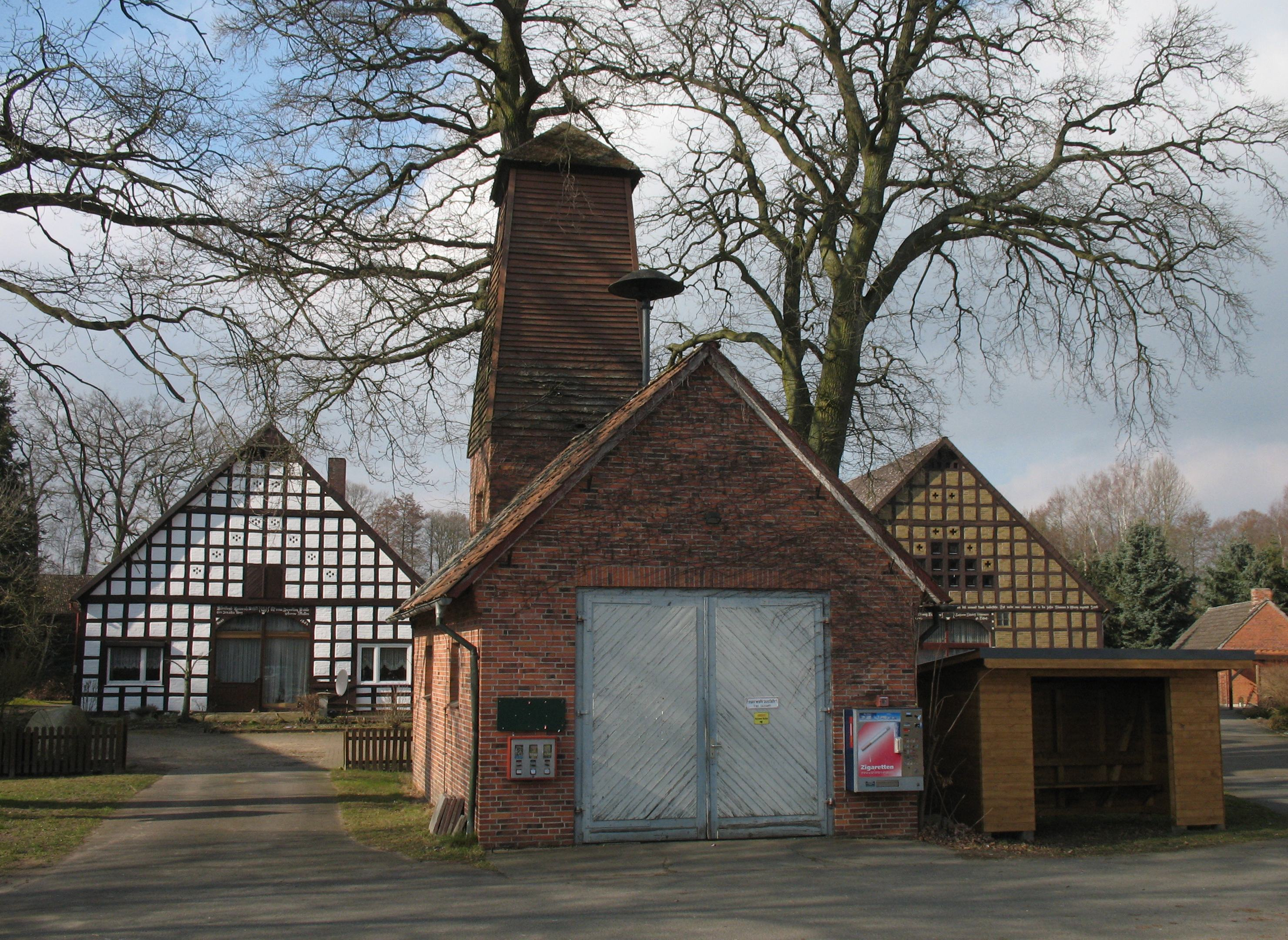
Breselenz

Since the Gebietsreform (municipality reform) in 1972, Jameln consists of ten villages:

- Breese im Bruche
- Breselenz
- Breustian
- Jameln
- Langenhorst
- Mehlfien
- Platenlaase
- Teichlosen
- Volkfien
- Wibbese

Additionally, there are three hamlets (Wohnplätze):

- Hoheluft
- Jamelner Mühle
- Krammühle

Before 1972, Hoheluft belonged to Volkfien, Jamelner Mühle to Jameln and Krammühle to Breselenz.

== Notable people ==
Mathematician Bernhard Riemann (1826–1866) was born in Breselenz.
