= Neu Darchau =

- Municipality
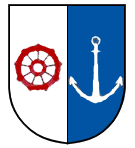
- Coat of arms

- Location of Neu Darchau within Lüchow-Dannenberg district
- Interactive map of Neu Darchau
- Location within Germany Location within Lower Saxony
- Coordinates: 53°14′N 10°53′E
- Country: Germany
- State: Lower Saxony
- District: Lüchow-Dannenberg
- Municipal assoc.: Elbtalaue
- Subdivisions: 9 Ortsteile

Government
  - Mayor: Ralf Hinneberg

Area
  - Total: 22.62 km^{2} (8.73 sq mi)
- Elevation: 17 m (56 ft)

Population (2025-12-31)
  - Total: 1,331
  - Density: 58.84/km^{2} (152.4/sq mi)
- Time zone: UTC+01:00 (CET)
  - Summer (DST): UTC+02:00 (CEST)
- Postal codes: 29490
- Dialling codes: 05853
- Vehicle registration: DAN

Neu Darchau is a municipality in the district Lüchow-Dannenberg, in Lower Saxony, Germany.
