= Elbe =

Major river in Central Europe

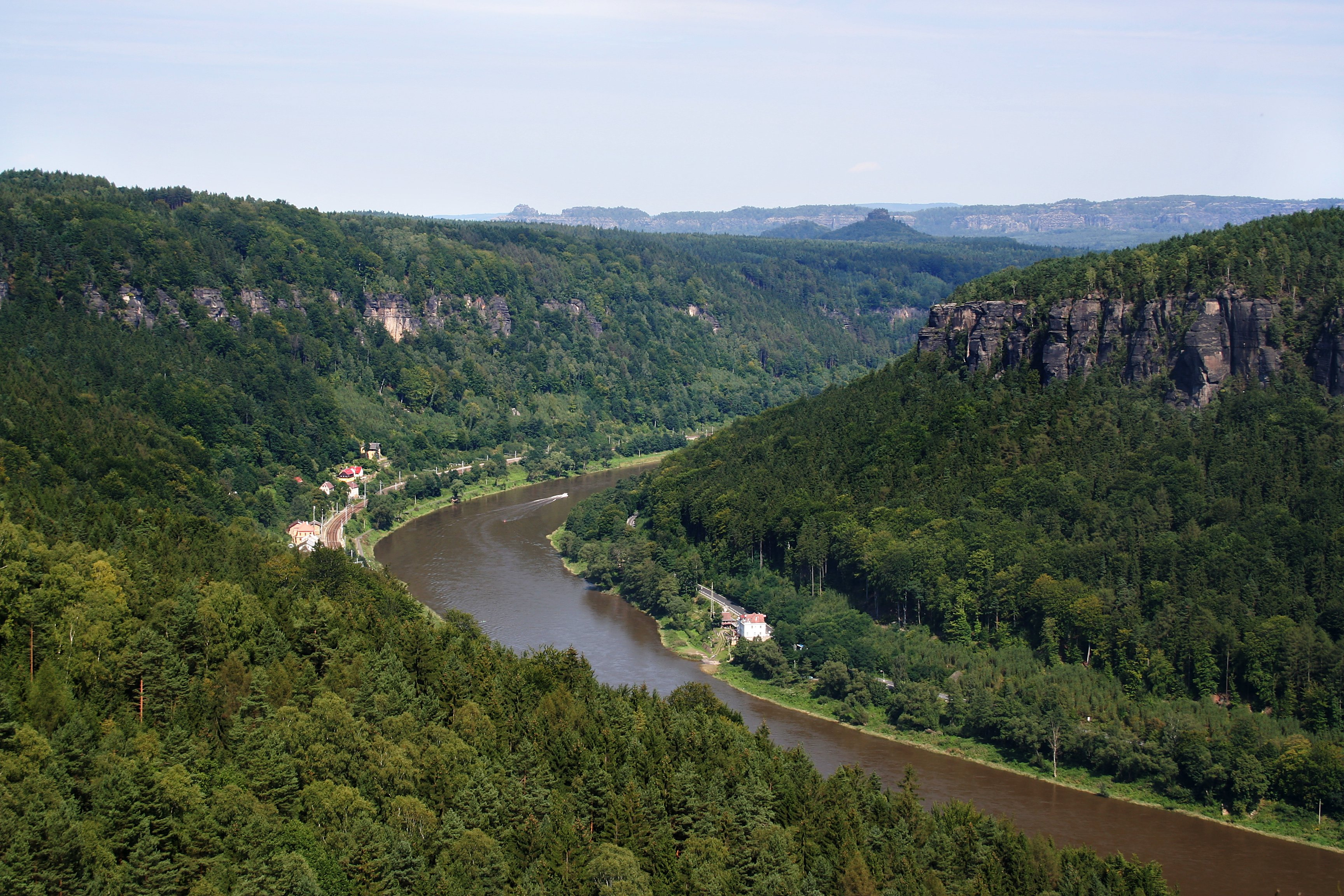
- The Elbe (Labe) near Děčín, Czech Republic

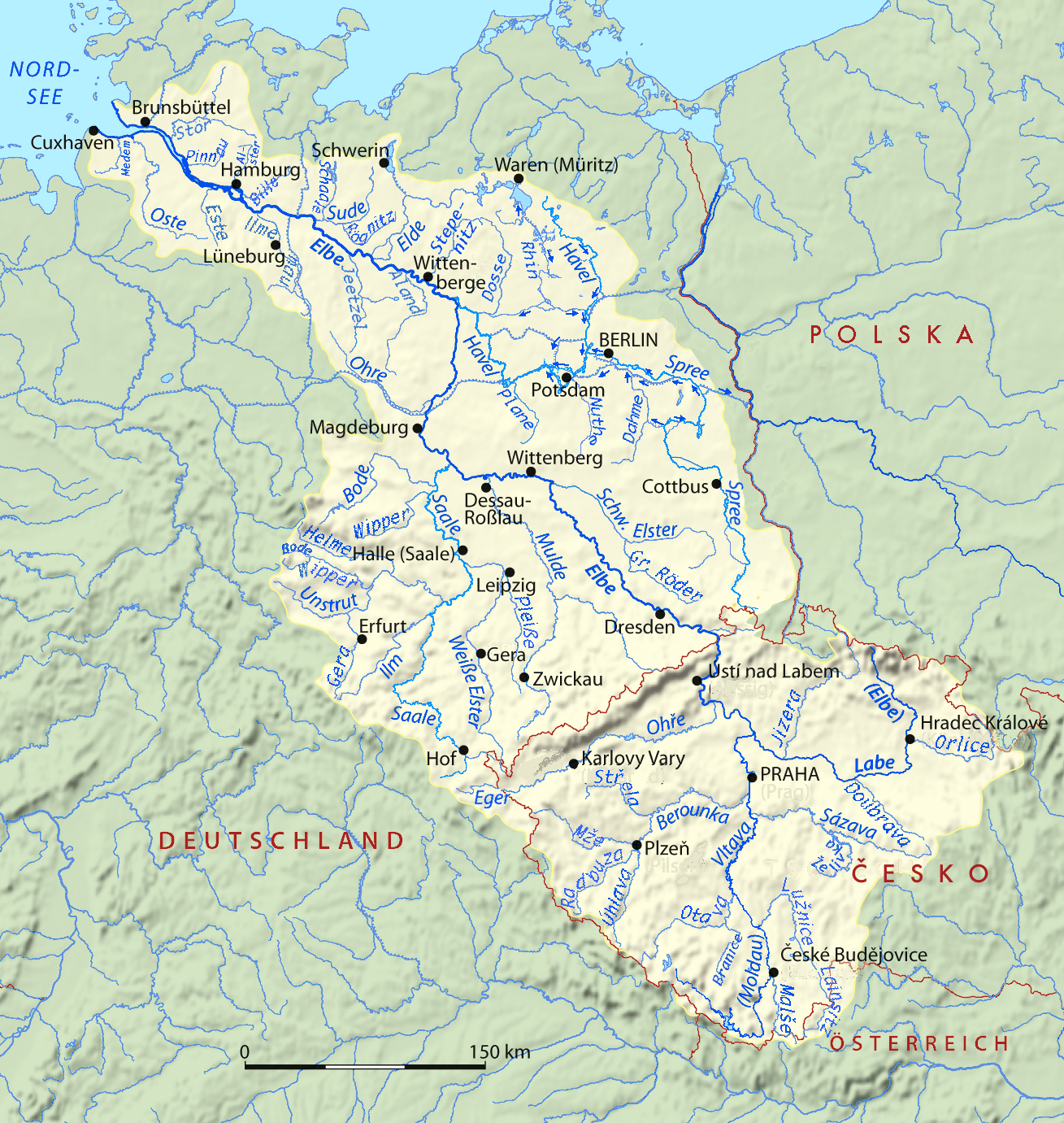
- The Elbe drainage basin
- Native name: Elbe (German); Labe (Czech); Ilv, Elv (Low German); Łobjo (Sorbian languages)

Location
- Countries: Czech Republic; Germany
- Regions (CZ): Hradec Králové; Pardubice; Central Bohemia; Ústí nad Labem
- States (DE): Saxony; Saxony-Anhalt; Brandenburg; Lower Saxony; Mecklenburg-Western Pomerania; Hamburg; Schleswig-Holstein
- Cities: Hradec Králové; Pardubice; Ústí nad Labem; Děčín; Dresden; Meissen; Wittenberg; Dessau; Magdeburg; Hamburg; Stade; Cuxhaven

Physical characteristics
- Source: Elbe Meadow
  - location: Giant Mountains, Czech Republic
  - coordinates: 50°46′32.59″N 15°32′10.14″E
  - elevation: 1,386 m (4,547 ft)
- Mouth: North Sea
  - location: Germany
  - coordinates: 53°55′20″N 8°43′20″E
  - elevation: 0 m (0 ft)
- Length: 1,112 km (691 mi)
- Basin size: 148,268 km^{2} (57,247 sq mi)
- Discharge
  - location: mouth
  - average: 870 m^{3}/s (31,000 cu ft/s)
  - minimum: 493 m^{3}/s (17,400 cu ft/s)
  - maximum: 1,232 m^{3}/s (43,500 cu ft/s)
- Discharge
  - location: Děčín
  - average: 303 m^{3}/s (10,700 cu ft/s)

Basin features
- Tributaries
  - left: Vltava, Ohře, Mulde, Saale, Ohre, Ilmenau, Este, Lühe, Schwinge, Oste, Medem
  - right: Jizera, Schwarze Elster, Havel, Elde, Bille, Alster, Mrlina

The Elbe (Czech: Labe) (Note: Czech pronunciation: [ˈlabɛ]; German pronunciation: [ˈɛlbə]; Low German: Ilv or Elv; Upper and Lower Sorbian: Łobjo, pronounced [ˈwɔbʲɔ]) is one of the major rivers of Central Europe. It rises in the Giant Mountains of the northern Czech Republic before traversing much of Bohemia (western half of the Czech Republic), then Germany before flowing into the North Sea at Cuxhaven, 110 kilometres (68 miles) northwest of Hamburg. Its total length is 1,094 km (680 mi).

The Elbe's major tributaries include the rivers Vltava, Ohře, Saale, Havel, Mulde, and Schwarze Elster.

The Elbe river basin, comprising the Elbe and its tributaries, has a catchment area of 148,268 square kilometres (57,247 sq mi), the twelfth-largest in Europe. The basin spans four countries; however, it lies almost entirely within two of them: Germany (65.5%) and the Czech Republic (33.7%), covering about two-thirds of the basin's area. On its southeastern edge, the Elbe River Basin also comprises small parts of Austria (0.6%) and Poland (0.2%). The Elbe catchment area is inhabited by 24.4 million people; its biggest cities are Berlin, Hamburg, Prague, Dresden and Leipzig.

== Etymology ==
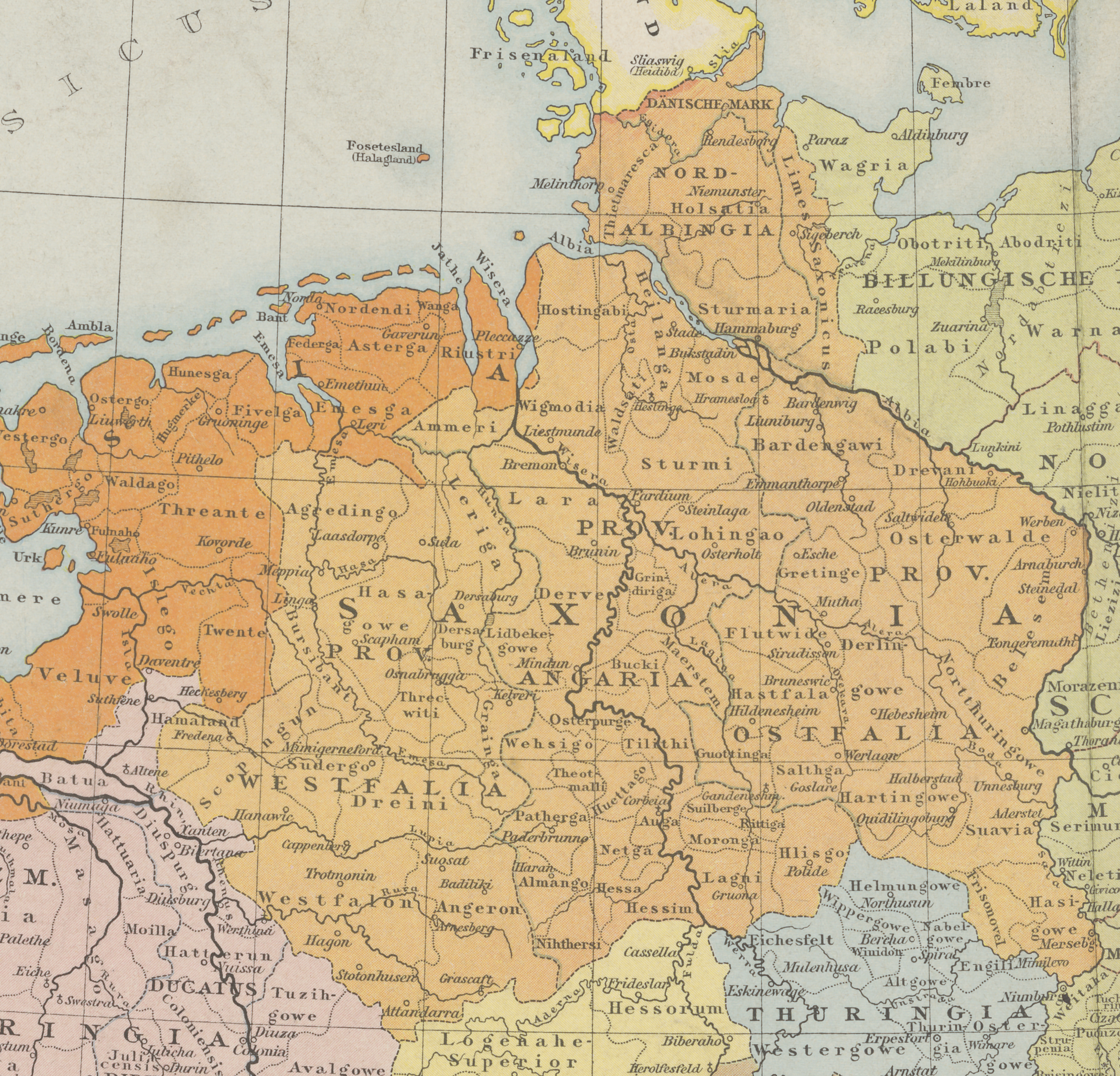
Albis or Albia are old medieval names for the river Elbe

First attested in Latin as Albis, the name Elbe means 'river' or 'riverbed' and is simply the High German version of the Proto-Germanic word (*albī) found elsewhere in Germanic; cf. Old Norse river name Elfr, Swedish älv 'river', Norwegian elv 'river', Old English river name Elf, and Middle Low German elve 'riverbed'.

== Course ==
=== In the Czech Republic ===
The Elbe (Labe) rises on the slopes of Mt. Violík at an elevation of 1,386 metres (4,547 ft) in the Giant Mountains on the northwest border of the Czech Republic. After descending the 30 metres (98 ft) Elbe Falls, it is joined by the steep, fast-flowing Bílé Labe. The combined stream then flows south, emerging from the mountain valleys at Jaroměř, where it is joined by the Úpa and Metuje.

Here, the Elbe enters the vast vale named Polabí (meaning "land along the Elbe"), and continues southward through Hradec Králové (where Orlice flows in) and then to Pardubice, where it turns sharply to the west. At Kolín, some 43 kilometres (27 mi) further on, it bends gradually northwest. At the village of Káraný, a little above Brandýs nad Labem, the Jizera enters.

At Mělník, its stream is more than doubled in volume by the Vltava, a major river which winds northwards through Bohemia. Upstream from the confluence, the Vltava is in fact much longer (434 km (270 mi) against 294 km (183 mi) of the Elbe so far), and has a greater discharge and a larger drainage basin. Nonetheless, for historical reasons, the river retains the name Elbe, also because at the confluence point, it is the Elbe that flows through the main wider valley. In contrast, the Vltava flows into the valley to meet the Elbe at almost a right angle, and thus appears to be the tributary river.

Some distance lower down, at Litoměřice, the waters of the Elbe are tinted by the reddish Ohře. Thus augmented, and swollen into a stream 140 m (460 ft) wide, the Elbe carves a path through the basaltic mass of the Central Bohemian Uplands, churning its way through a picturesque, deep, narrow, and curved rocky gorge.

=== In Germany ===
Shortly after crossing the Czech-German frontier and passing through the sandstone defiles of the Elbe Sandstone Mountains, the river assumes a north-westerly direction, which it generally maintains all the way to the North Sea.

The river flows through Dresden and finally, beyond Meissen, enters upon its long journey across the North German Plain passing along the former western border of East Germany, touching Torgau, Wittenberg, Dessau, Magdeburg, Wittenberge, and Hamburg along the way, and taking on the waters of the Mulde and Saale from the west, and those of the Schwarze Elster, Havel and Elde from the east. In its northern section, both banks of the Elbe are characterized by flat, very fertile marshlands (Elbe Marshes), former flood plains of the Elbe now diked.

At Magdeburg, there is a viaduct, the Magdeburg Water Bridge, that carries a canal and its shipping traffic over the Elbe and its banks, allowing shipping traffic to pass under it unhindered.

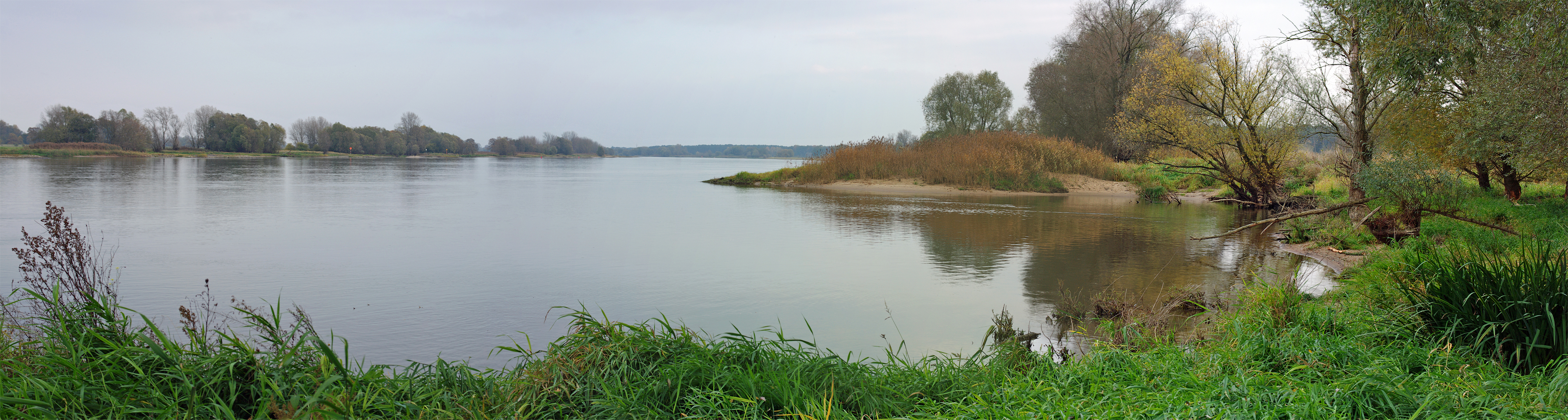
The Middle Elbe in the North German Plain near the village of Gorleben. In this section, the river had been part of the Iron Curtain between West and East Germany during the Cold War. For that reason, the river banks even today look relatively natural and undeveloped. (Photo taken in 2011)

From the sluice of Geesthacht (at kilometer 586) downstream, the Elbe is subject to the tides; the tidal Elbe section is called the Unterelbe (Low Elbe). Soon, the Elbe reaches Hamburg. Within the city-state, the Unterelbe has several branch streams, such as Dove Elbe, Gose Elbe, Köhlbrand, Norderelbe (Northern Elbe), Reiherstieg, Süderelbe (Southern Elbe). Some of which have been disconnected from the main stream for vessels by dikes. In 1390, the Gose Elbe (literally in English: shallow Elbe) was separated from the main stream by a dike connecting the two then-islands of Kirchwerder and Neuengamme. The Dove Elbe (literally in English: deaf Elbe) was diked off in 1437/38 at Gammer Ort. These hydraulic engineering works were carried out to protect marshlands from inundation, and to improve the water supply of the Port of Hamburg. After the heavy inundation by the North Sea flood of 1962, the western section of the Southern Elbe was separated, becoming the Old Southern Elbe, while the waters of the eastern Southern Elbe now merge into the Köhlbrand, which is bridged by the Köhlbrandbrücke, the last bridge over the Elbe before the North Sea.

The Northern Elbe passes the Elbe Philharmonic Hall and is then crossed under by the old Elbe Tunnel (Alter Elbtunnel), both in Hamburg's city center. A bit more downstream, the Lower Elbe's two main anabranches, the Northern Elbe and the Köhlbrand, reunite south of Altona-Altstadt, a locality of Hamburg. Right after both anabranches reunite, the Low Elbe is crossed by the New Elbe Tunnel (Neuer Elbtunnel), the last structural road link across the river before the North Sea. At the bay Mühlenberger Loch in Hamburg at kilometer 634, the Northern Elbe and the Southern Elbe (here now the cut-off meander Old Southern Elbe) used to reunite, which is why the bay is seen as the starting point of the Niederelbe (Lower Elbe). Leaving the city-state, the Lower Elbe then passes between Holstein and the Elbe-Weser Triangle with Stade until it flows into the North Sea at Cuxhaven. Near its mouth, it passes the entrance to the Kiel Canal at Brunsbüttel before it flows into the North Sea.

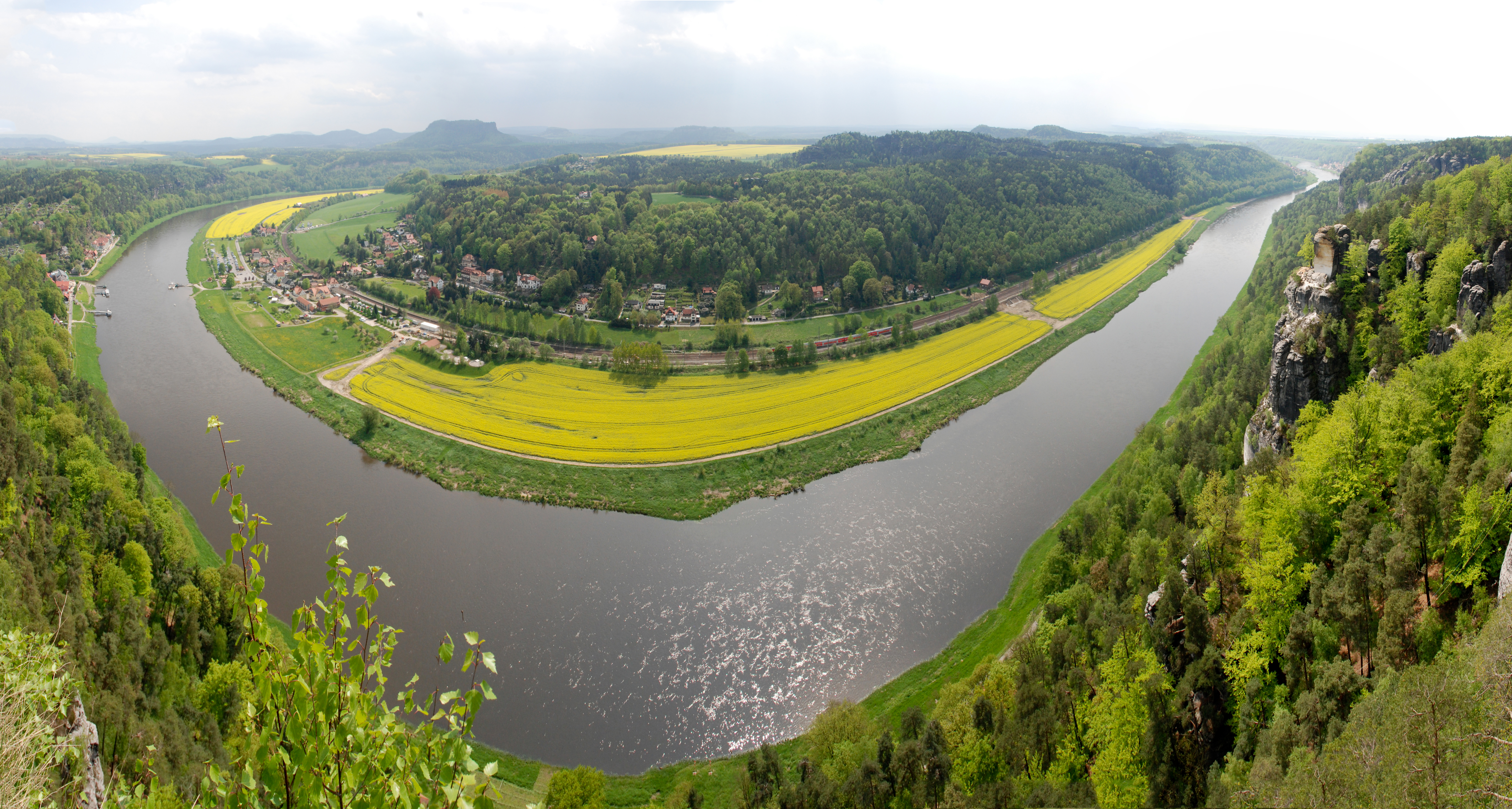
View of the Elbe in Saxon Switzerland, an area in Germany

== Cities and towns ==
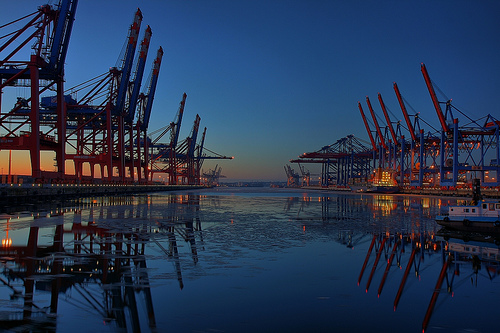
The Port of Hamburg on the Elbe

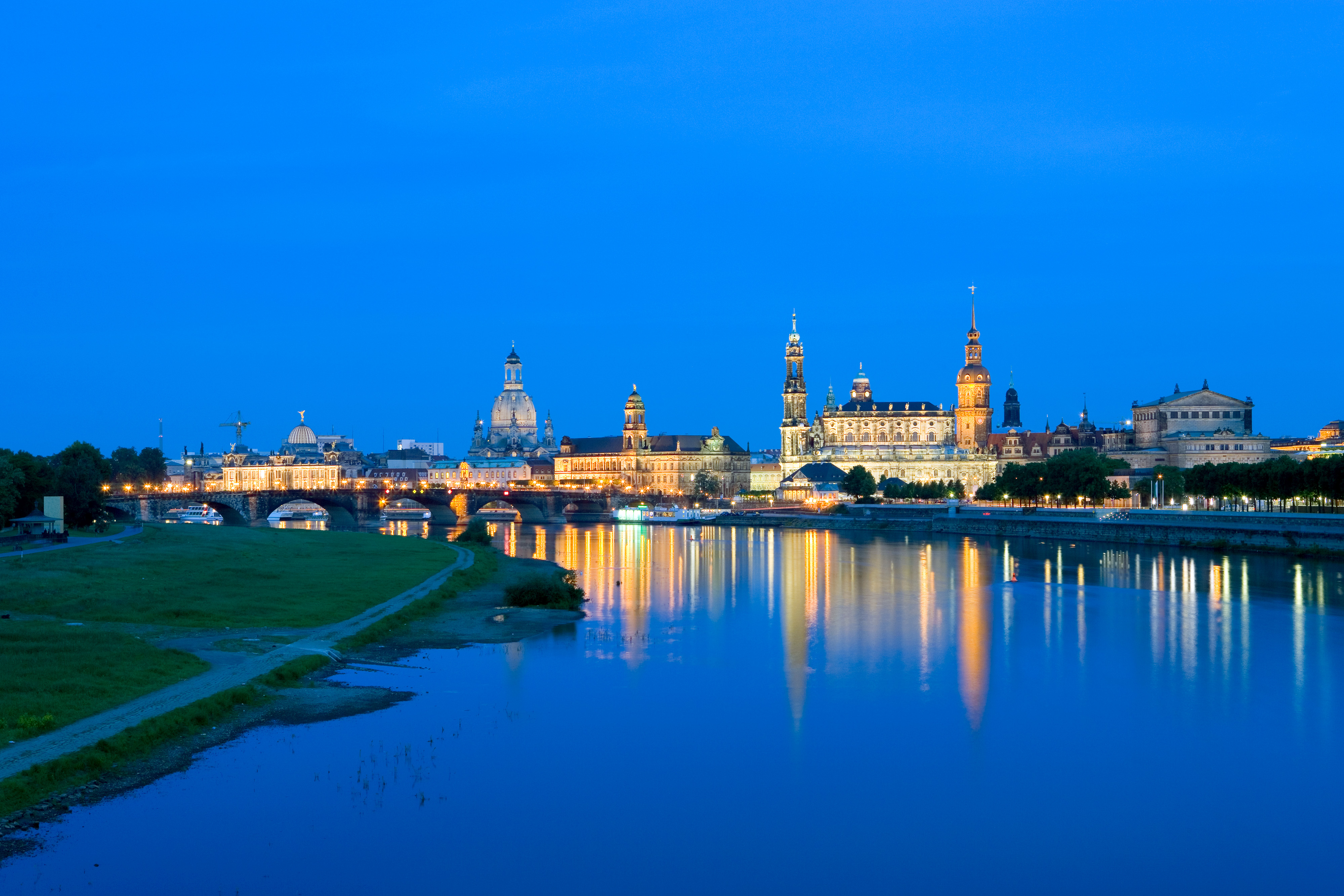
The Elbe passing Dresden

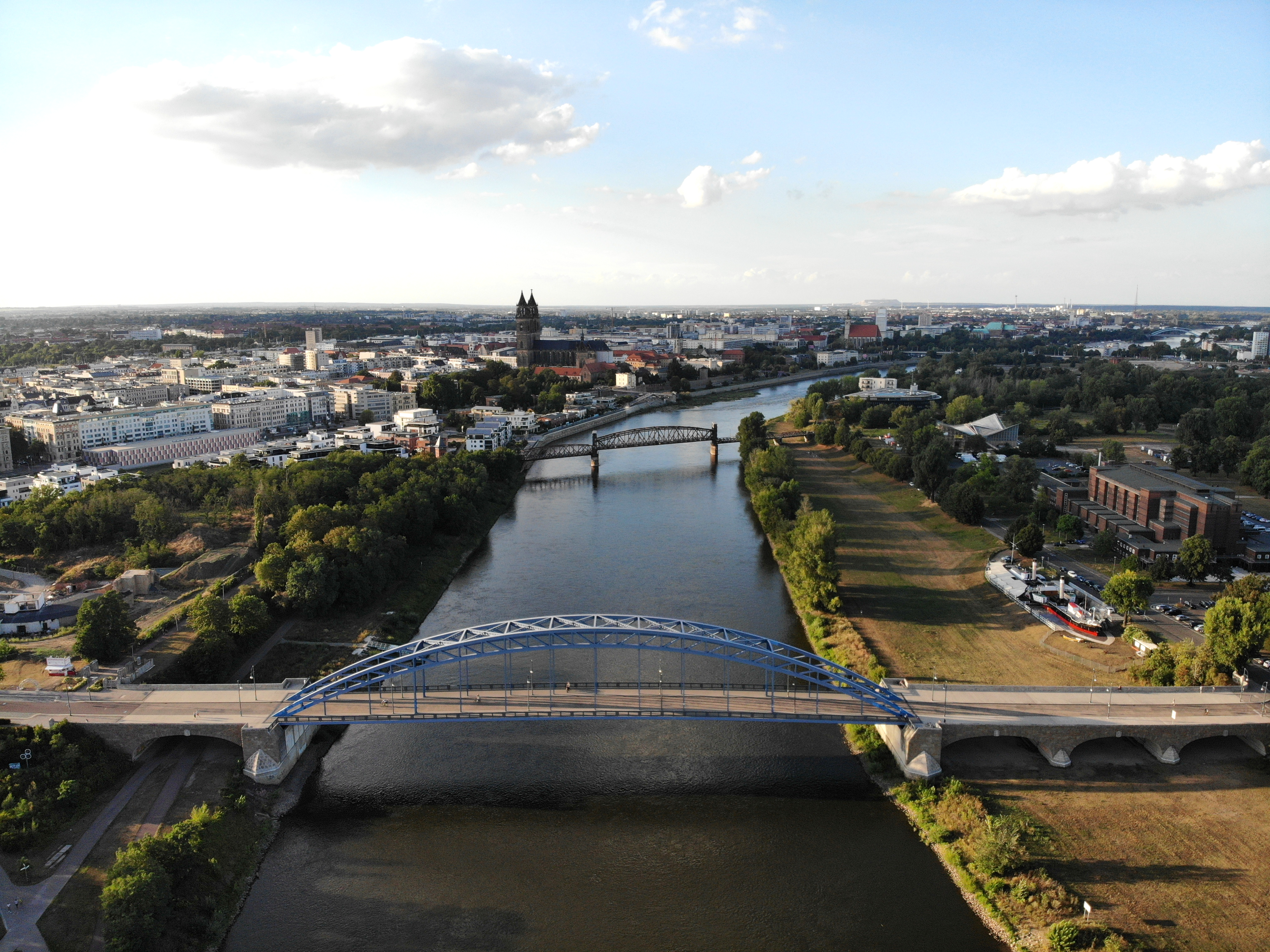
The Elbe flows through Magdeburg

Town	Population
Špindlerův Mlýn	1,089
Vrchlabí	11,968
Dvůr Králové nad Labem	15,316
Jaroměř	12,487
Smiřice	3,142
Hradec Králové	93,354
Pardubice	92,713
Kolín	33,392
Poděbrady	15,238
Brandýs nad Labem-Stará Boleslav	20,926
Mělník	20,301
Štětí	8,536
Roudnice nad Labem	12,561
Litoměřice	22,627
Lovosice	8,744
Ústí nad Labem	90,035
Děčín	46,003
Bad Schandau	3,346
Königstein	2,151
Pirna	40,128
Heidenau	16,686
Dresden	564,904
Radebeul	32,979
Coswig (Saxony)	20,479
Meissen	28,753
Riesa	29,373
Strehla	3,644
Belgern-Schildau	7,363
Torgau	19,992
Wittenberg	45,249
Coswig (Saxony-Anhalt)	11,129
Dessau-Roßlau	75,402
Aken (Elbe)	7,153
Barby	7,813
Schönebeck	30,419
Magdeburg	244,329
Tangermünde	10,212
Wittenberge	17,058
Dömitz	2,864
Hitzacker	4,566
Bleckede	9,154
Boizenburg	11,048
Lauenburg	11,657
Geesthacht	33,519
Hamburg	1,973,896
Wedel	34,912
Stade	48,633
Glückstadt	11,410
Brunsbüttel	12,692
Otterndorf	7,515
Cuxhaven	49,697

== Navigation ==
The Elbe has always been navigable by commercial vessels, and provides important trade links as far inland as Prague. The river is linked by canals (Elbe Lateral Canal, Elbe-Havel Canal, Mittellandkanal) to the industrial areas of Germany and to Berlin. The Elbe-Lübeck Canal links the Elbe to the Baltic Sea, as does the Kiel Canal, whose western entrance is near the mouth of the Elbe. The Elbe-Weser Shipping Channel connects the Elbe with the Weser.

By the Treaty of Versailles, the navigation on the Elbe became subject to the International Commission of the Elbe, seated in Dresden. The commission was staffed with two representatives of Czechoslovakia and one representative of Anhalt, Belgium, France, Hamburg, Italy, Prussia, Saxony, and the United Kingdom each, with Czechoslovakia and the German states being those, whose territory was crossed by the Elbe and thus competent for maintaining navigation installations. The statute of the commission was signed in Dresden on 22 February 1922. Following articles 363 and 364 of the Treaty of Versailles, Czechoslovakia was entitled to lease its own harbor basin, Moldauhafen in Hamburg. The lease contract with Germany, supervised by the United Kingdom, was signed on 14 February 1929 and ended in 2028. Since 1993, the Czech Republic has held the former Czechoslovak legal position.

Before Germany was reunited, waterway transport in Western Germany was hindered because inland navigation to Hamburg had to pass through the German Democratic Republic. The Elbe-Seitenkanal (Elbe Lateral Canal) was built between the West German section of the Mittellandkanal and the Lower Elbe to restore this connection. When the two nations were reunited, work began to improve and restore the original links: the Magdeburg Water Bridge now allows large barges to cross the Elbe without entering the river. The often low water levels of the Elbe no longer hinder navigation to Berlin.

== Islands ==
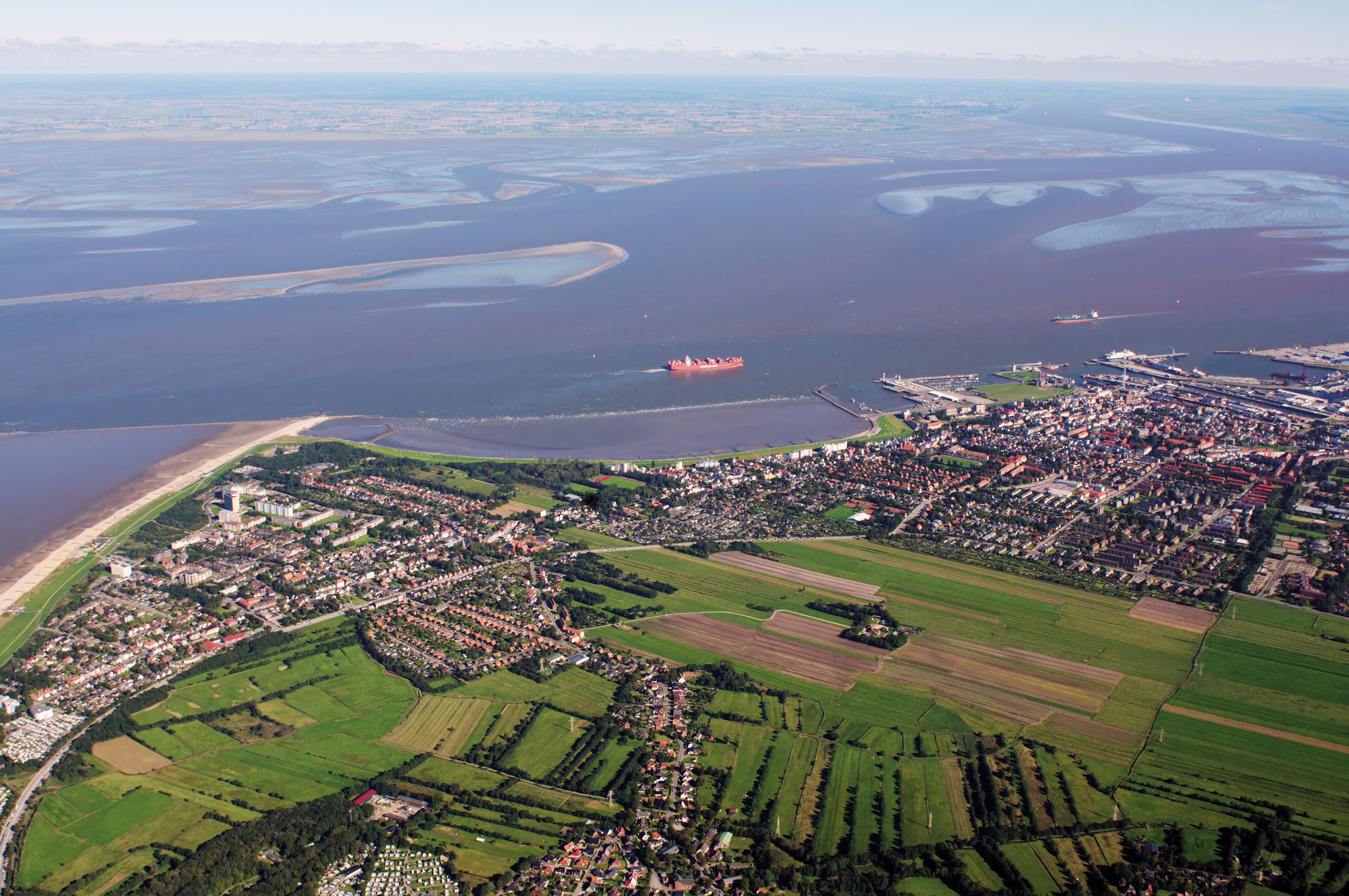
Cuxhaven

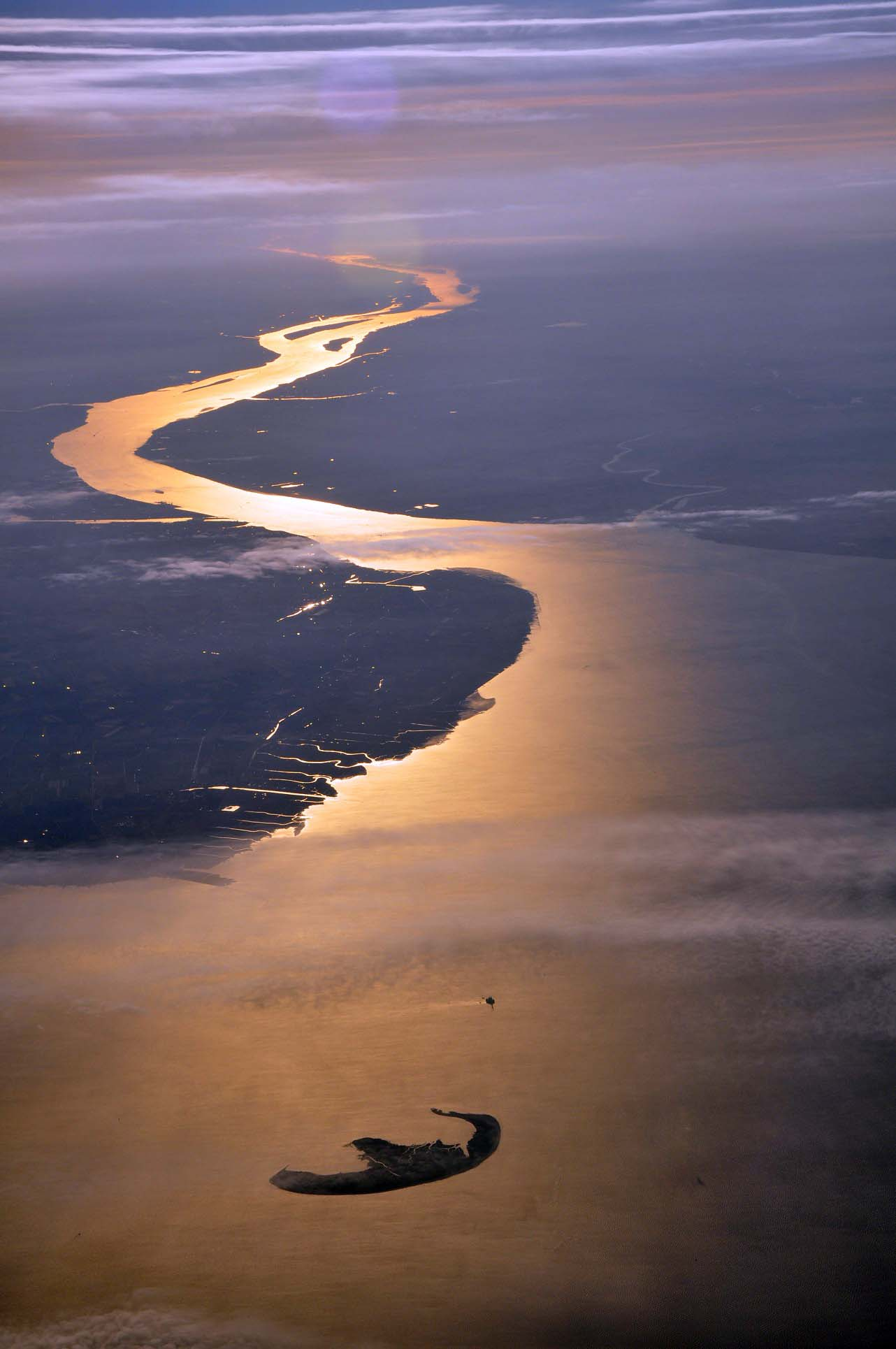
The mouth of the Elbe with the island of Trischen in the North Sea

=== Headwaters ===
- Hořejší – in Kolín
- Kmochův – in Kolín

=== Upper reaches ===
- Pillnitzer Elbinsel – in Dresden's southern quarter of Pillnitz in the Dresden Basin
- Gauernitzer Elbinsel – east of Gauernitz in the Dresden Basin between Dresden and Meißen

=== Middle Elbe ===
- Rotehorninsel – in Magdeburg
- Steinkopfinsel – in Magdeburg

=== Between Northern and Southern Elbe (Norderelbe/Süderelbe) ===
- Wilhelmsburg, including the islands Veddel, Georgswerder, Kleiner Grasbrook, Steinwerder, Peute and several more – in Hamburg's borough of Mitte (centre)
- Kaltehofe (also "Kalte Hofe") – in Hamburg's borough of Mitte
- Finkenwerder – in Hamburg's borough of Mitte

=== Lower Elbe ===
- Schweinesand – south of Blankenese (Hamburg)
- Neßsand – south of Tinsdal
- Hahnöfersand – north of Jork
- Hanskalbsand – south of Schulau
- Lühesand – east of Stade
- Bisterhorster Sand – west of Wedel
- Pagensand – west of Seestermühe
- Schwarztonnensand – east of Drochtersen
- Rhinplate – west of Glückstadt

=== Outer Elbe (estuary) ===
- Neuwerk – an exclave – in Hamburg's borough of Mitte
- Scharhörn – an exclave of Hamburg's borough of Mitte
- Nigehörn – an exclave Hamburg's borough of Mitte

=== Former islands ===
- Medemsand

== Ferries ==
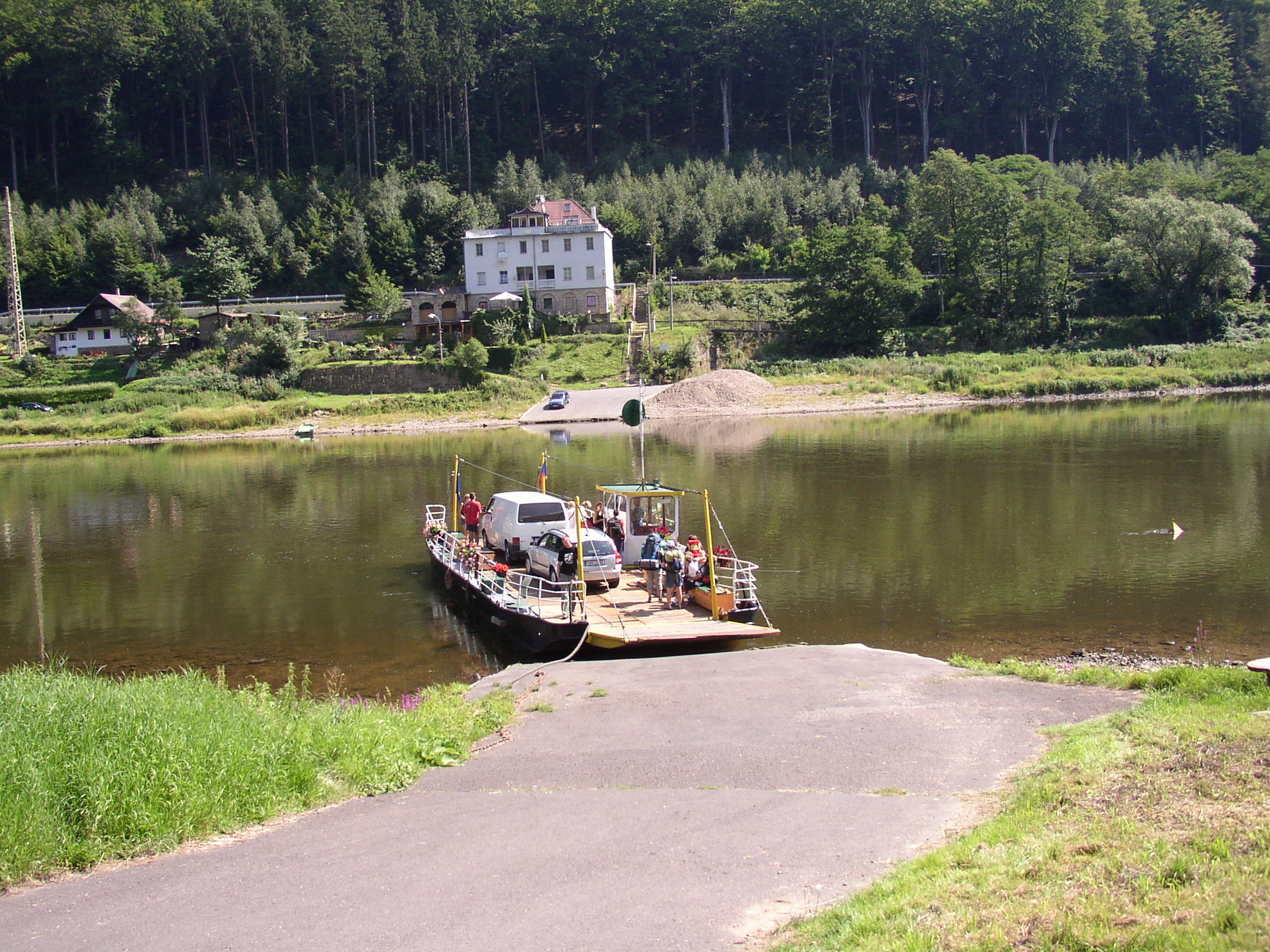
The Dolní Žleb Ferry

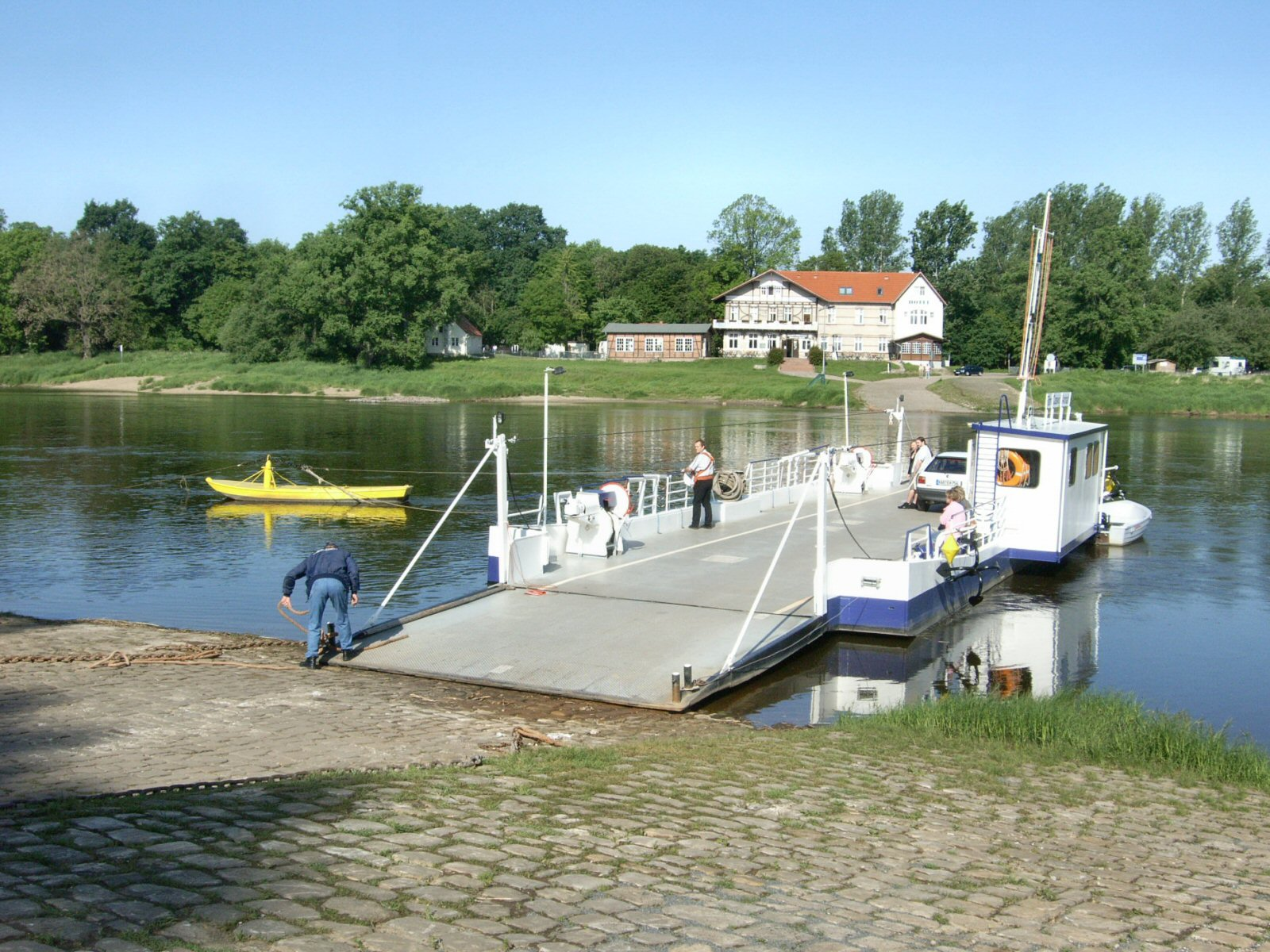
The Wörlitz Coswig Ferry

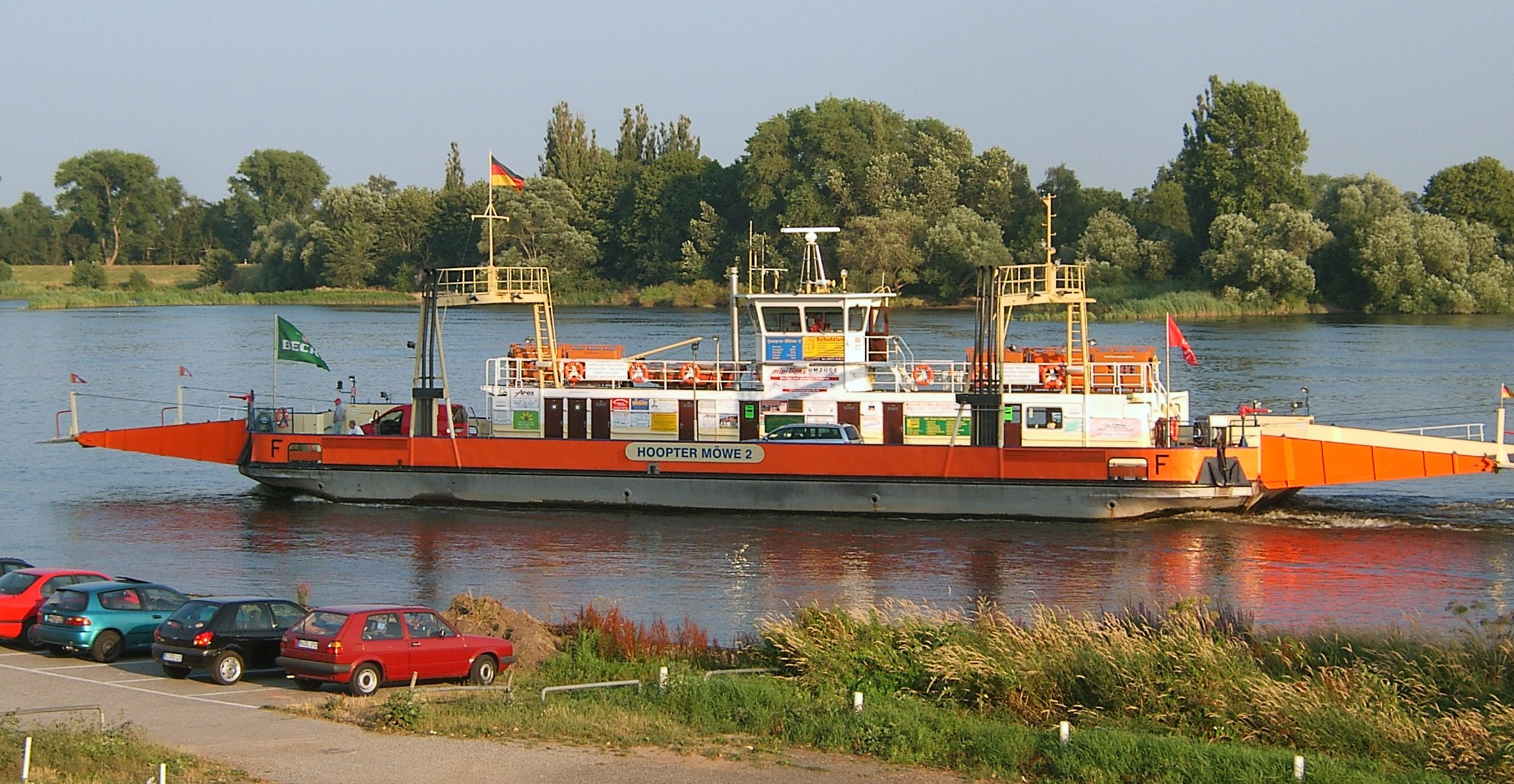
The Zollenspieker Ferry

The Elbe is crossed by many ferries, both passenger and car-carrying. In downstream order, these include:

- Dolní Žleb Ferry, at Dolní Žleb part of Děčín
- Rathen Ferry, at Rathen
- Pillnitz Kleinzschachwitz Ferry, in the eastern suburbs of Dresden
- Laubegast Niederpoyritz Ferry, in Dresden
- Johannstadt Neustadt Ferry, in Dresden
- Belgern Ottersitz Ferry, between Belgern and Ottersitz
- Dommitzsch Prettin Ferry, between Dommitzsch and Prettin
- Mauken Pretzsch Ferry, between Mauken and Pretzsch
- Wartenburg Elster Ferry, between Wartenburg and Elster
- Wörlitz Coswig Ferry, between Wörlitz and Coswig
- Steutz Aken Ferry, between Steutz and Aken
- Tochheim Ferry, between Tochheim and Alt Tochheim near Breitenhagen
- Ronney Barby Ferry, between Barby and Walternienburg
- Westerhüsen Ferry, at Westerhüsen near Magdeburg
- Schartau Rogätz Ferry, between Schartau and Rogätz
- Ferchland Grieben Ferry, between Ferchland and Grieben
- Sandau Büttnershof Ferry, between Sandau and Büttnershof
- Räbel Havelberg Ferry, between Räbel and Havelberg
- Lenzen Pevestorf Ferry, between Lenzen and Pevestorf
- Neu Darchau Darchau Ferry, between Darchau and Neu Darchau
- Bleckede Ferry, between Bleckede and Neu Bleckede
- Zollenspieker Ferry, between Kirchwerder, a part of the Bergedorf borough of Hamburg, and Hoopte, part of the town Winsen (Lühe), in the state of Lower Saxony, about 30 kilometers (19 mi) south-east of Hamburg center
- Ferries in the port of Hamburg, operated by HADAG
- Wischhafen Glückstadt Ferry, between Wischhafen and Glückstadt to the west of Hamburg
- Brunsbüttel Cuxhaven Ferry, between Brunsbüttel and Cuxhaven at the mouth of the river (out of service as of October 2022).

Many of these ferries are traditional reaction ferries, a type of cable ferry that uses the current flow of the river to provide propulsion.

== Prehistory ==
Humans first lived in the northern Elbe region before about 200,000 years ago, during the Middle Paleolithic.

== History ==
Ptolemy recorded the Elbe as Albis (Germanic for "river") in Germania Magna, with its source in the Asciburgis mountains (Giant Mountains), where the Germanic Vandalii then lived.

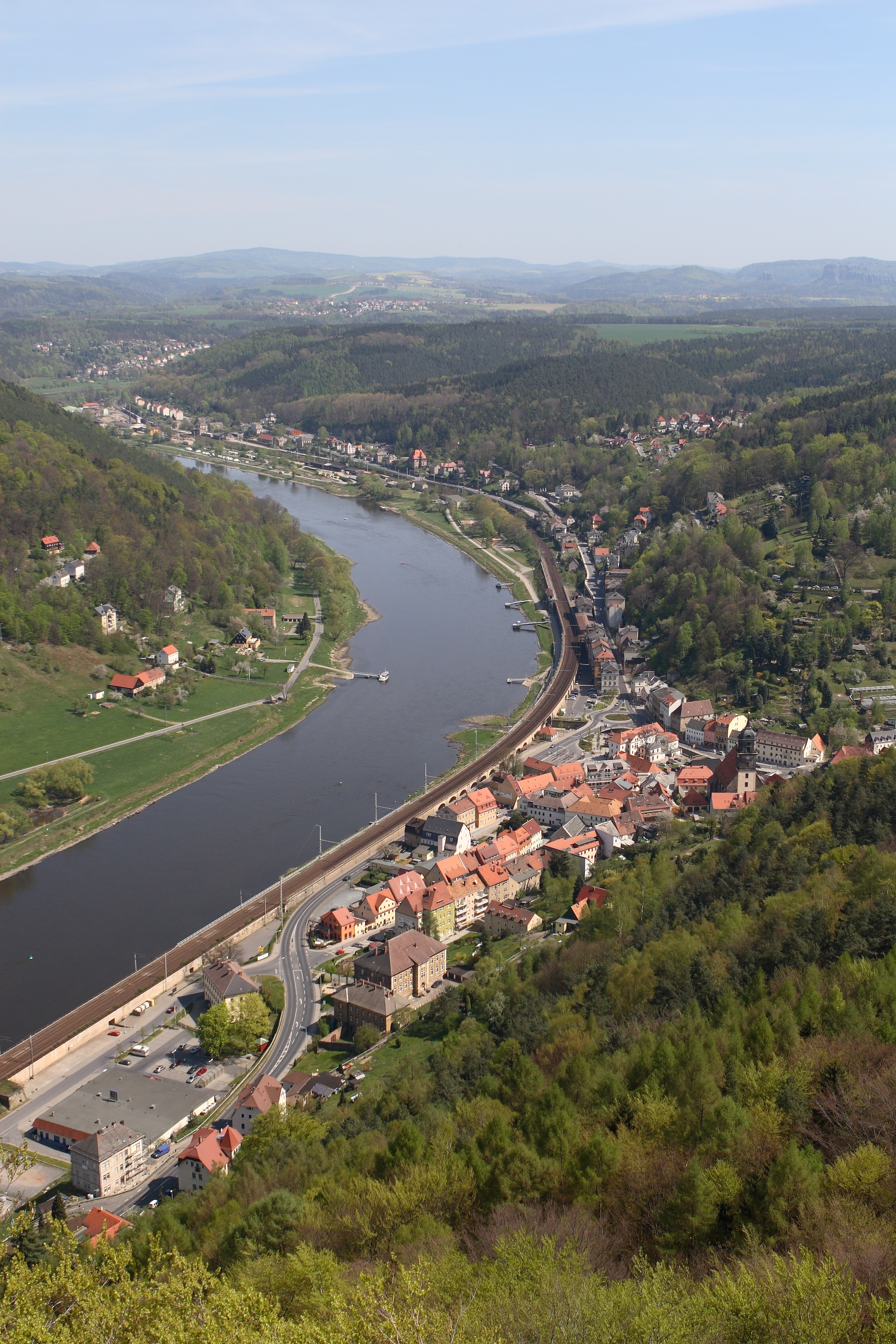
The Elbe near Königstein Fortress in Germany

The Elbe has long served as an important delineator of European geography. The Romans knew the river as the Albis; however, they made only one serious attempt to move the border of their empire forward from the Rhine to the Elbe, and this attempt failed with the Battle of the Teutoburg Forest in 9 AD, after which they never seriously tried again. In the Middle Ages, the Elbe formed the eastern limit of the Empire of Charlemagne (King of the Franks from 769 to 814). The river's navigable sections were essential to the success of the Hanseatic League in the Late Middle Ages, and much trade was carried on its waters.

From the early 6th century, Slavic tribes (known as the Polabian Slavs) settled in the areas east of the rivers Elbe and Saale (which had been depopulated since the 4th century). In the 10th century, the Ottonian Dynasty (dominant from 919 to 1024) began conquering these lands; a slow process of Germanization ensued, including the Wendish Crusade of 1147.

The Elbe delineated the western parts of Germany from the eastern so-called East Elbia, where soccage and serfdom were stricter and prevailed longer than to the west of the river, and where feudal lords held larger estates than in the west. Thus, incumbents of huge land-holdings became characterized as East Elbian Junkers. The Northern German region north of the Lower Elbe was known as North Albingia in the Middle Ages. When the four Lutheran church bodies there united in 1977, they chose the name North Elbian Evangelical Lutheran Church. Other administrative units were named after the river Elbe, such as the Westphalian Elbe département (1807–1813) and Lower Elbe département (1810), and the French département Bouches-de-l'Elbe (1811–1814).

On 10 April 1945, General Wenck of the German Twelfth Army located to the west of Berlin to guard against the advancing American and British forces. But as the Western Front moved eastwards and the Eastern Front moved westwards, the German armies on both fronts backed towards each other. As a result, the area of control of Wenck's army to his rear and east of the Elbe River had become a vast refugee camp for Germans fleeing from the approaching Soviet Army. Wenck took great pains to provide food and lodging for these refugees. At one stage, the Twelfth Army was estimated to be feeding more than a quarter of a million people every day. During the night of 28 April, Wenck reported to the German Supreme Army Command in Fuerstenberg that his Twelfth Army had been forced back along the entire front. According to Wenck, no attack on Berlin was possible as support from Busse's Ninth Army could no longer be expected. Instead, starting 24 April, Wenck moved his army towards the Forest of Halbe, broke into the Halbe pocket and linked up with the remnants of the Ninth Army, Hellmuth Reymann's "Army Group Spree", and the Potsdam garrison. Wenck brought his army, remnants of the Ninth Army, and many civilian refugees across the Elbe and into territory occupied by the U.S. Army.

In 1945, as World War II drew to a close, Germany came under attack from the armies of the western Allies advancing from the west and those of the Soviet Union advancing from the east. On 25 April 1945, these two forces linked up near Torgau, on the Elbe. The victorious countries marked the event unofficially as Elbe Day. From 1945 to 1990 the Elbe formed part of the Inner German border between East Germany and West Germany.

During the 1970s, the Soviet Union stated that Adolf Hitler's ashes had been scattered in the Elbe following disinterment from their original burial site.

== See also ==
- 2002 European floods – Major European floods in August 2002
- 2006 European floods – Floods affecting Eastern Europe
- 2013 European floods – May–June floods in central Europe caused by heavy rainfall
- Saxon Elbeland – Region of the Upper Elbe in Germany
- Saxon Switzerland – Hilly natural area in Saxony, Germany
- List of waterbodies in Saxony-Anhalt

== Bibliography ==
- Rada, Uwe (2013). Die Elbe. Europas Geschichte im Fluss (in German). Munich: Siedler. ISBN 978-3-88680-995-0.
