= Bramfeld =

- Quarter of Hamburg
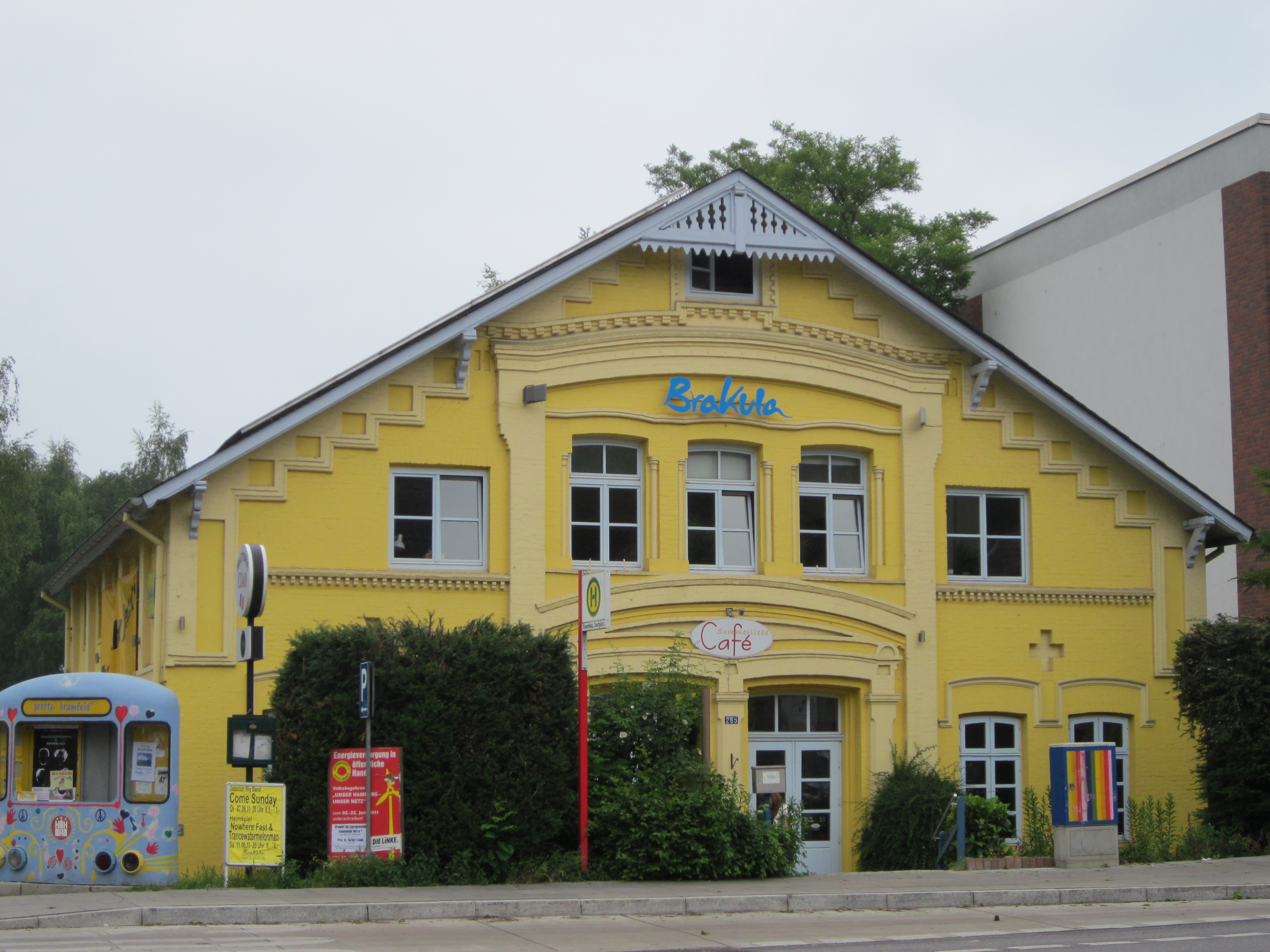
- Culture Center Brakula

- Location of Bramfeld in Hamburg
- Interactive map of Bramfeld
- Location within Germany Location within Hamburg
- Coordinates: 53.608611°N 10.0725°E
- Country: Germany
- State: Hamburg
- City: Hamburg
- Borough: Hamburg-Wandsbek

Area
  - Total: 10.1 km^{2} (3.9 sq mi)

Population (2024-12-31)
  - Total: 53,543
  - Density: 5,300/km^{2} (13,700/sq mi)
- Time zone: UTC+01:00 (CET)
  - Summer (DST): UTC+02:00 (CEST)
- Dialling codes: 040
- Vehicle registration: HH

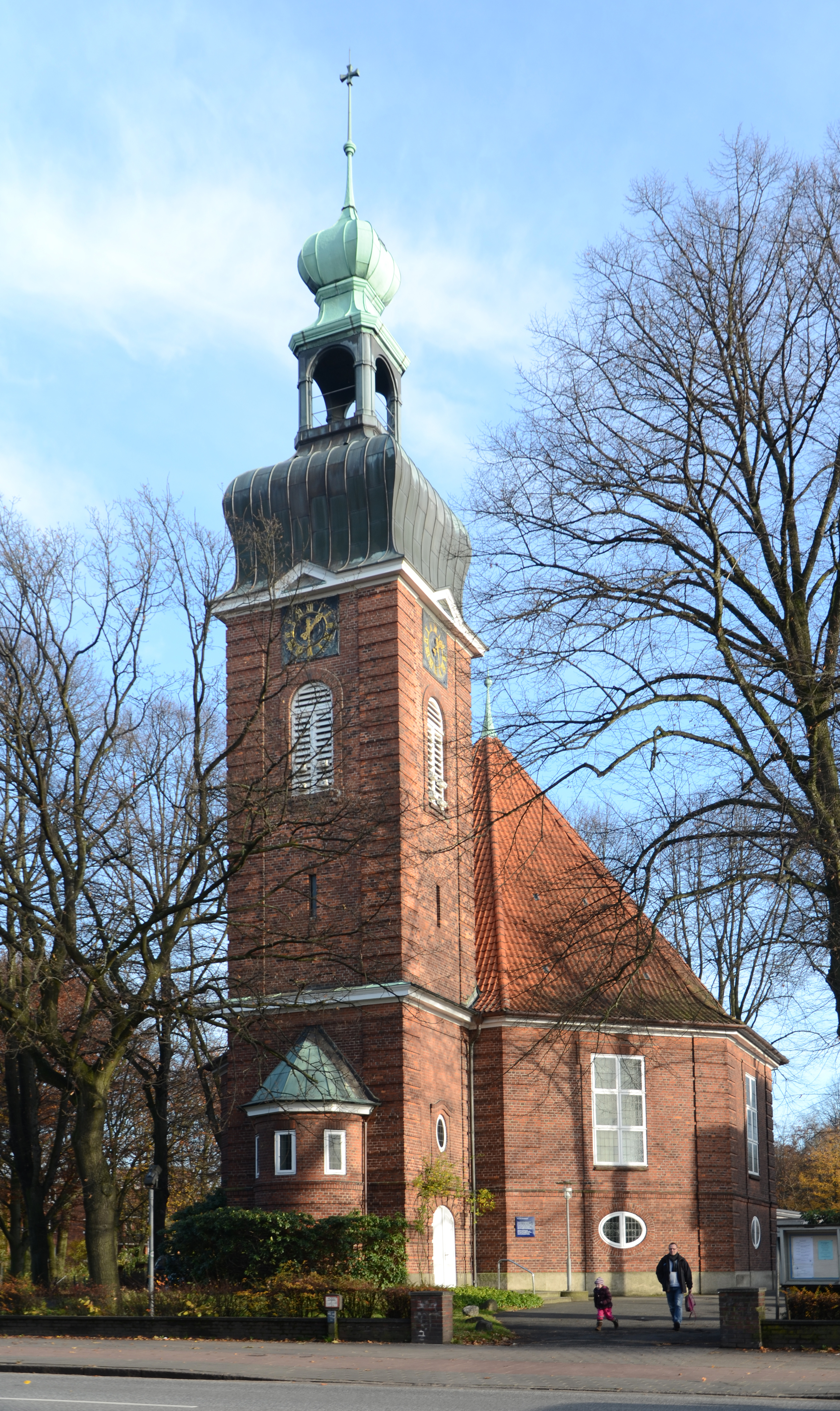
The Osterkirche (Easter Church) was built in 1913/14

Bramfeld (German pronunciation: [ˈbʁaːmfɛlt]) is a quarter of Hamburg, Germany, in the borough of Wandsbek. It is located on the southeastern border of the borough, which lies in the northeastern part of the city. Bramfeld includes the former village of Hellbrook, but consists today out of residential as well as of commercial areas. Around 52,700 inhabitants live in the quarter.

== Geography ==
Bramfeld borders the quarters of Sasel, Farmsen-Berne, Wandsbek, Barmbek-Nord, Steilshoop, Ohlsdorf and Wellingsbüttel. The lake of Bramfelder See is located at Bramfeld boundaries on Steilshoop territory. The streams of Seebek (former Grenzbach, lit. border stream) and Osterbek flow also at the boundaries of Bramfeld. The Seebek forms the border to Barmbek-Nord and Steilshoop, while the Osterbek marks the border to Wandsbek and Farmsen-Berne.

== History ==
In 1271 Bramfeld was first recorded as a village. The name refers to genista, Ginster and also Brambusch in German, which characterized the landscape at that time. The bush is also in the blazon of Bramfeld. In the 15th century, the farming village of Bramfeld was home to only ten farmers. In the 17th century, Bramfeld remained in Holstein and gradually developed into an artisan and farming village near Hamburg. In 1913/14 the church of Osterkirche (Easter church) was built. Bramfeld was incorporated into Hamburg in 1937 with the Greater Hamburg Act. There are plans to build an underground line to the quarter.

== Politics ==
These are the results of Bramfeld in the Hamburg state election:

Election	Bramfeld						
Election	SPD	Greens	CDU	AfD	Left	FDP	Others
2020	47,2 %	17,6 %	9,9 %	8,1 %	7,3 %	3,5 %	6,4 %
2015	54,5 %	7,5 %	13,7 %	7,9 %	6,9 %	5,7 %	3,8 %
2011	54,9 %	8,0 %	20,3 %	–	8,3 %	5,4 %	6,5 %
2008	35,0 %	6,5 %	44,3 %	–	6,7 %	4,4 %	3,1 %
2004	32,5 %	7,5 %	49,2 %	–	–	2,9 %	7,9 %
2001	39,6 %	5,3 %	24,5 %	–	0,2 %	4,3 %	26,1 %
1997	40,5 %	9,1 %	29,4 %	–	0,4 %	3,0 %	17,6 %
1993	45,8 %	10,2 %	22,4 %	–	–	3,4 %	18,2 %
