= Bramfelder See =

Lake in Hamburg, Germany

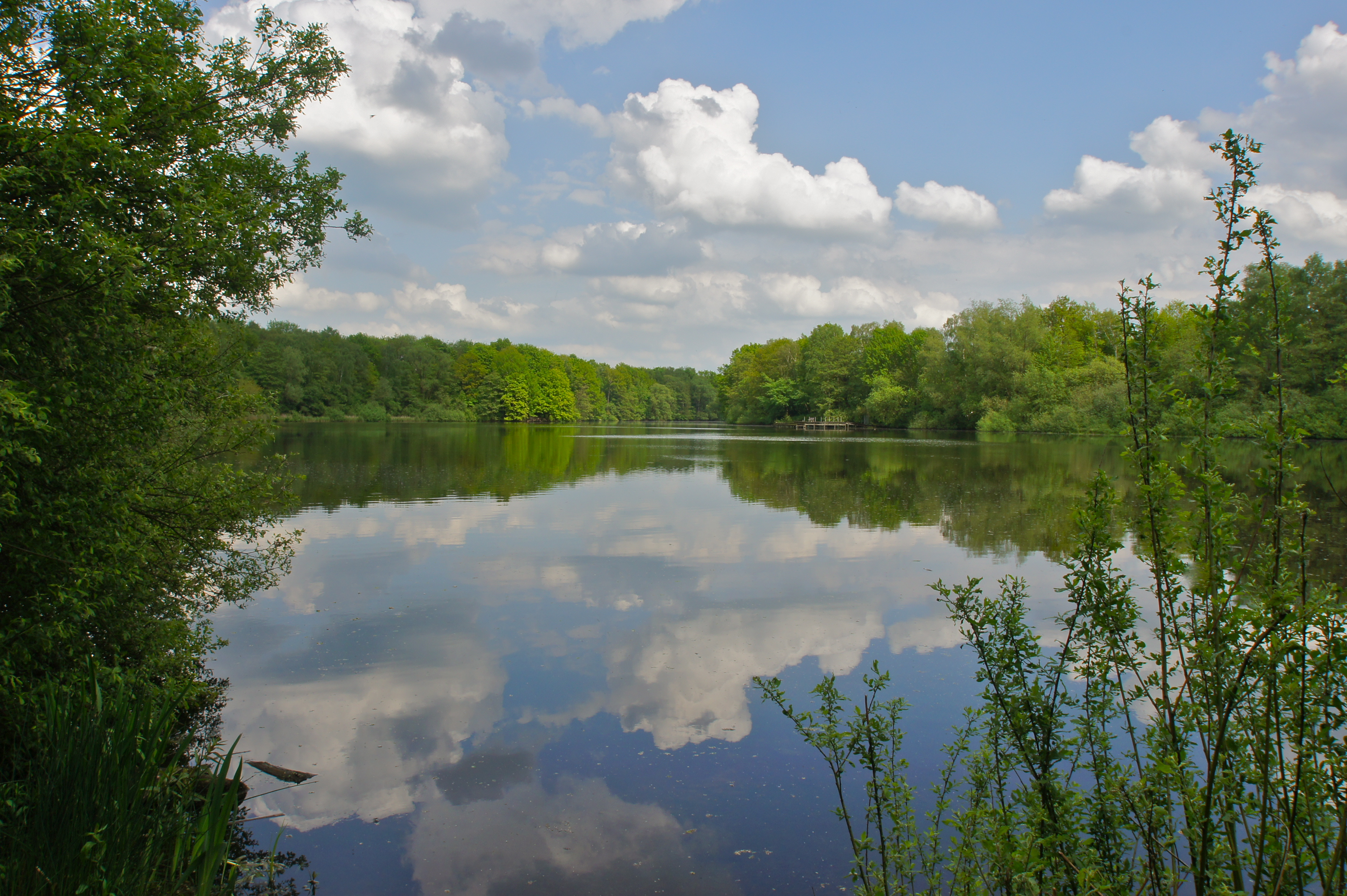
- Bramfelder See in 2012

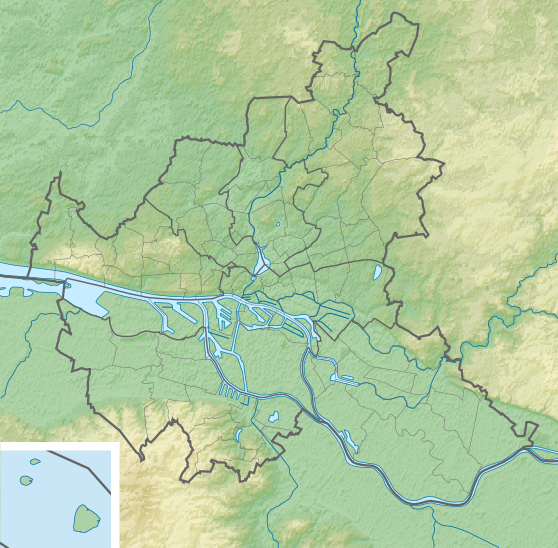
- Location within Hamburg
- Location: Steilshoop, Hamburg, Germany
- Coordinates: 53.6194°N 10.0671°E
- Etymology: Bramfeld
- Primary inflows: Several springs
- River sources: Seebek
- Max. length: 1.2 kilometres (0.75 mi)
- Max. width: 400 metres (1,300 ft)
- Average depth: 3 metres (9.8 ft)

Bramfelder See (German pronunciation: [ˈbʁaːmfɛldɐ ˈzeː]) is a lake in Steilshoop, Hamburg, Germany, which is named after the nearby former village of Bramfeld. It is fed by several springs, among others from the former swamp of Prökelmoor, located today on the compound of nearby Ohlsdorf Cemetery. Bramfelder See extends to a length of 1.2 km and to a width of between 100 and 400 m, and to a depth of up to 3 m. Four islands are located in the lake. The stream of Seebek flows from the lake in a southerly direction.

In the night of 17 to 18 January 2010 unknown perpetrators broke the lock at the outlet sluice and let the water under the ice of the lake drain into Seebek stream. As a result, the majority of the fish population died. The Sport Fishing Association Elbe e.V. feared that it will take years until the lake is recovering from this disaster.
