= Picture clock with Alster panorama =

External videos
- description of the subjects visible in the painting
- description of the mechanical aspects and their restoration

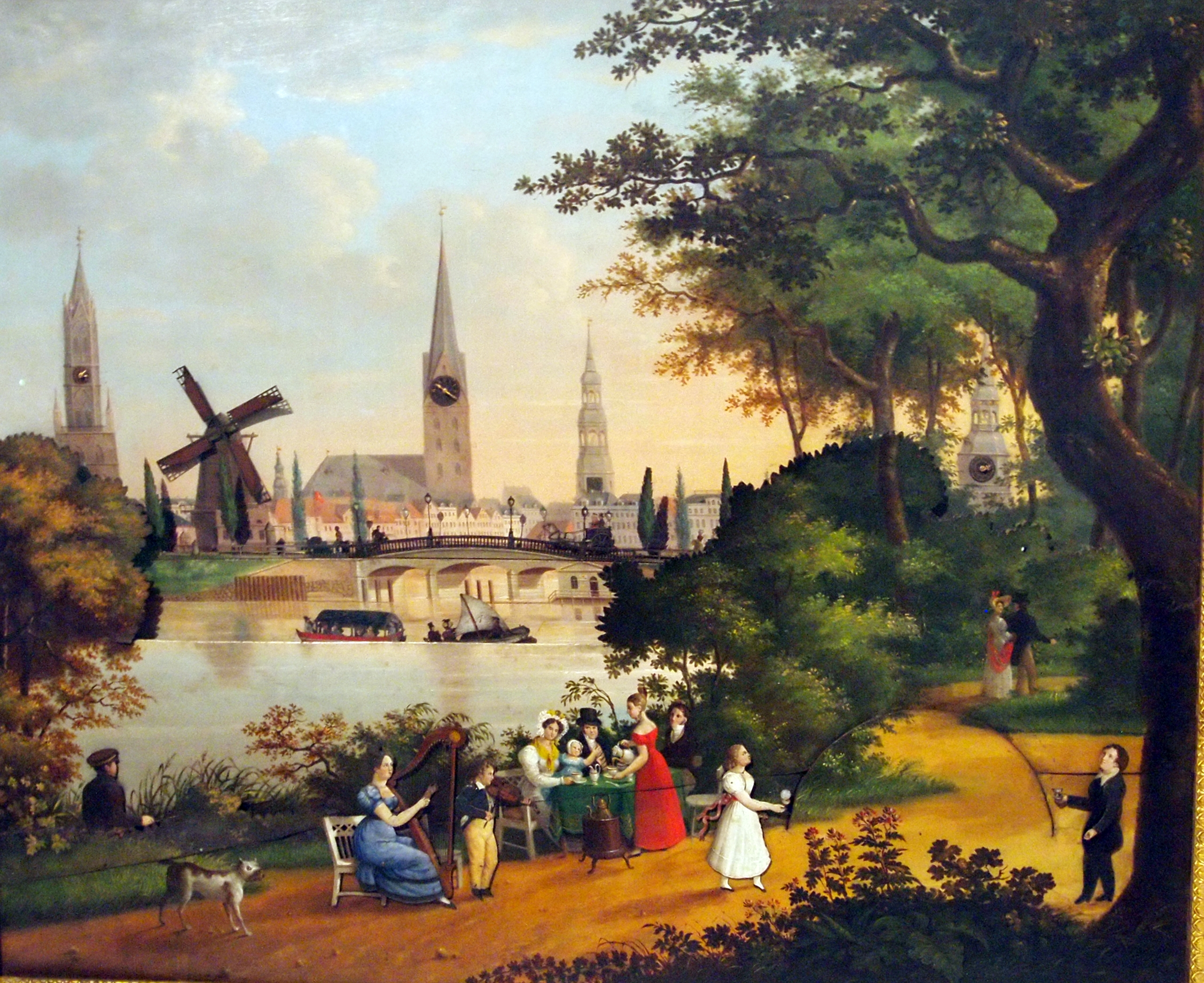
Front view of the picture clock

The Picture clock with Alster panorama (German: Bilderuhr mit Alsterpanorama), also known as the Coffeeparty on the Alster with view over Lombard Bridge to the city (German: Kaffeegesellschaft an der Alster mit Blick über Lombardsbrücke auf die Stadt), is a picture clock or music box painting (Spieluhr-Gemälde) – an oil painting of a landscape scene with integrated mechanical clock, automata and music box – that is in the collection of the Museum for Hamburg History. 74 cm x 89 cm in size, it was made between 1827 and 1830 by an unknown group of artists and craftsmen. It was restored in 2012 by the museum and watchmaker Helmut Tüxen.

== Composition ==
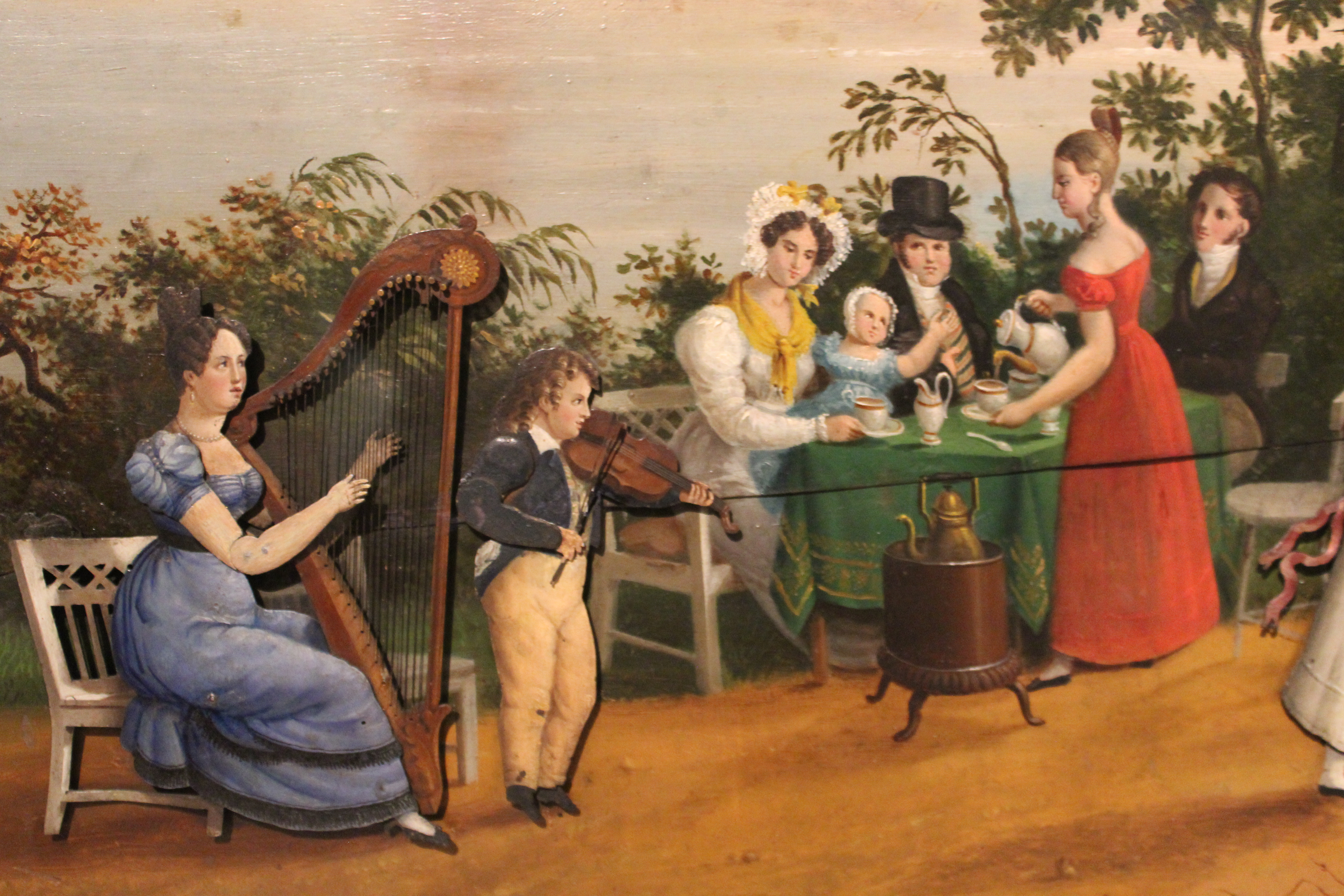
Detail of the foreground

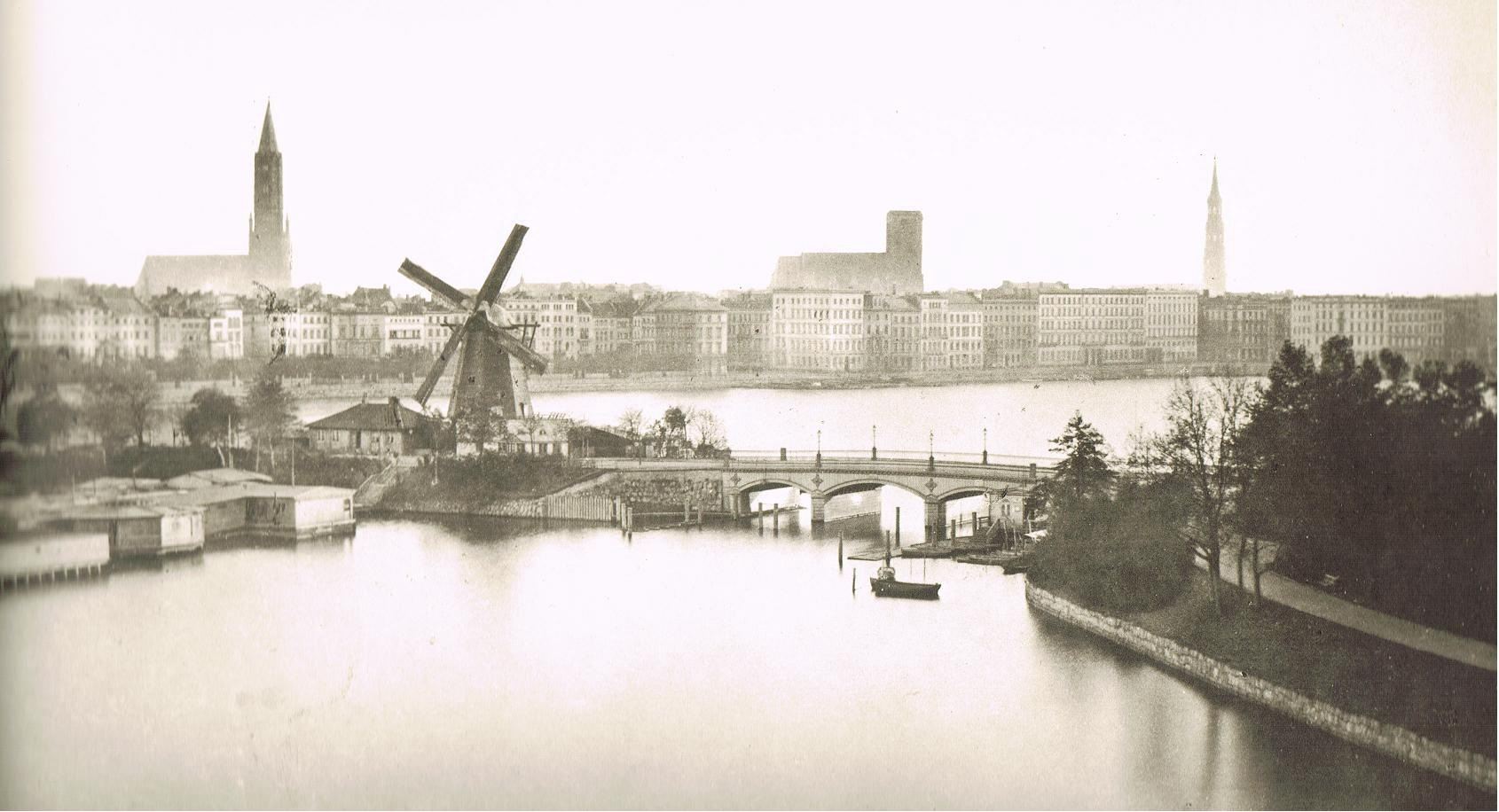
Photograph from 1860 showing the windmill, bridge and city, from about the same orientation as the painting

The foreground of the painting shows a group of people drinking coffee in a park on the bank of the Außenalster lake, along with musicians and children playing. The background shows the Lombardsbrücke (Lombard Bridge), and behind that a panorama of the city of Hamburg.

From left to right, the recognizable buildings are:

- St. James' Church (St. Jacobi)
- A windmill near the Alster (one of the five that still existed on the Hamburg Wallring at that time)
- The Hamburg workhouse (Werk- und Zuchthaus)
- St. Peter's Church (St. Petri)
- St. Catherine's Church (St. Katharinen)
- St. Nicholas' Church (St. Nikolai)

These landmarks indicate that the scene is set on the western bank of the Außenalster and oriented directly towards the south, at approximately the location where the present-day Straße Fontenay reaches the shoreline. St. Peter's, St. Nicholas', and the workhouse were all destroyed during the Great fire of Hamburg in May 1842, 12 to 15 years after the painting was made. The wooden Lombard Bridge was replaced in the 1860s with the version known today, and in 1953, the parallel Kennedy Bridge (originally called the Neu Lombardsbrücke) was built. It now obscures the Lombard Bridge from the painting's viewpoint.

== Mechanical elements ==
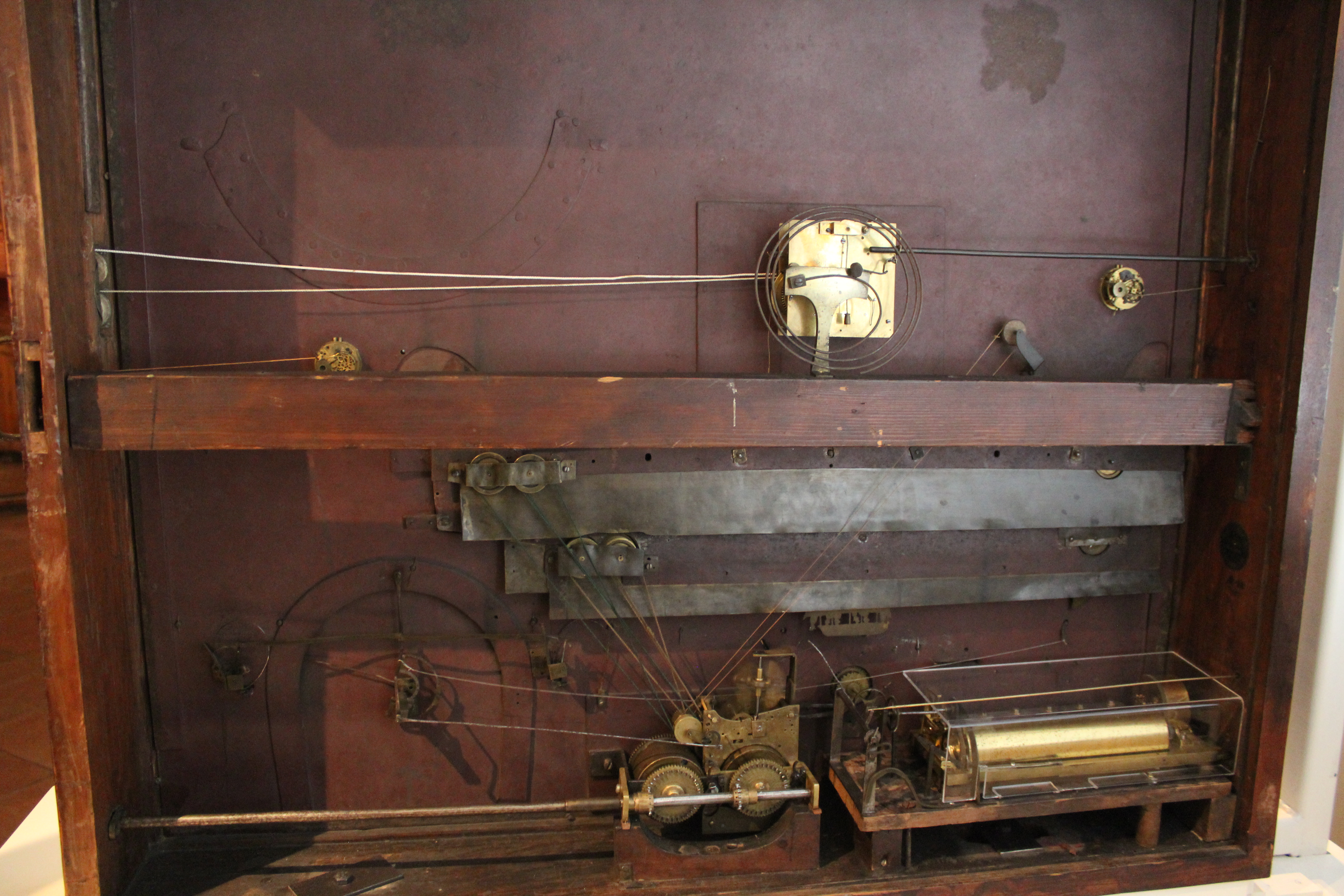
Rear view of mechanical elements

The several church towers feature working clocks. Other mechanically operated elements of the scene are:

- the windmill turning
- two children playing cup-and-ball
- a harpist's and a violinist's arms moving
- various boats moving across the lake
- horse-borne and foot traffic crossing the bridge
- a fisherman's rod
