= Scharfrichterpfennig =

The Scharfrichterpfennig ("Executioner's Penny") was a silver medal weighing a double thaler, which the incumbent executioner presented to the oldest judge of the city of Hamburg when he retired from the court. For the period between 1540 and 1810, a Scharfrichterpfennig was minted and presented annually. Some of the surviving specimens are in the Museum of Hamburg History.

== Literature ==
- Buchenau, Heinrich (1918). 'Unbekannter Scharfrichterpfennig. In: Blätter für Münzfreunde, Vol. 53, p. 480, ISSN 0935-7165
- Dimpfel, Arthur (1904). "Ein Hamburger "Scharfrichterpfennig". In: Der deutsche Herold, Vol. 35, pp. 41-42.
