= Gisela Jaacks =

German folklorist

Gisela Jaacks (born August 19, 1944, in Güstrow) is a German folklorist. She was director of the Museum for Hamburg History from 2002 to 2008. Since 1986, she has been a professor of cultural history at the University of the Arts Bremen.
