= Außenalster =

- Outer Alster
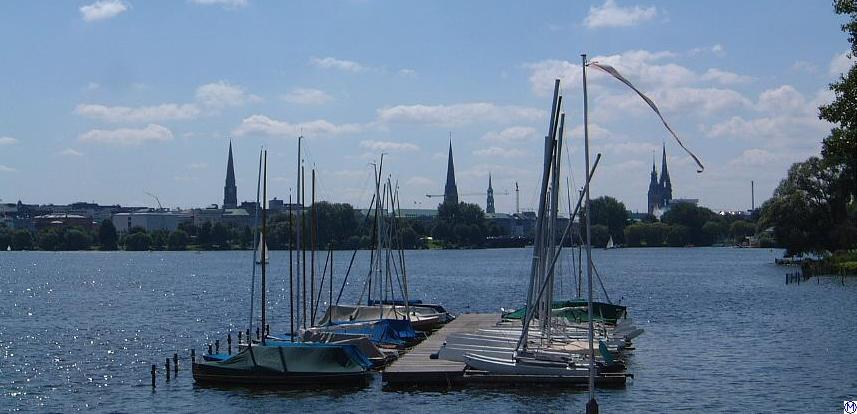
- The Außenalster as seen from Rotherbaum; in the background Hamburg's church towers

- Location within Germany
- Location: Hamburg
- Coordinates: 53°33′54″N 10°0′36″E
- Type: artificial lake
- Primary inflows: Alster, Osterbek, Wandse
- Primary outflows: Alster (Binnenalster)
- Basin countries: Germany
- Max. length: 2.8 km (1.7 mi)
- Max. width: 1.0 km (0.62 mi)
- Surface area: 1.64 km^{2} (164 ha)
- Average depth: 2.5 m (8.2 ft)
- Max. depth: 3.5 m (11 ft)

Außenalster (pronounced [ˈaʊsn̩ˌʔalstɐ]) or Outer Alster Lake is the larger of the two artificial lakes formed by the Alster river in Hamburg, Germany, the other being the Binnenalster. The Außenalster and its shores are used by the inhabitants of Hamburg for many sport and recreational purposes, such as sailing and rowing.

== Overview ==
Map of the Außenalster and its surrounding areas

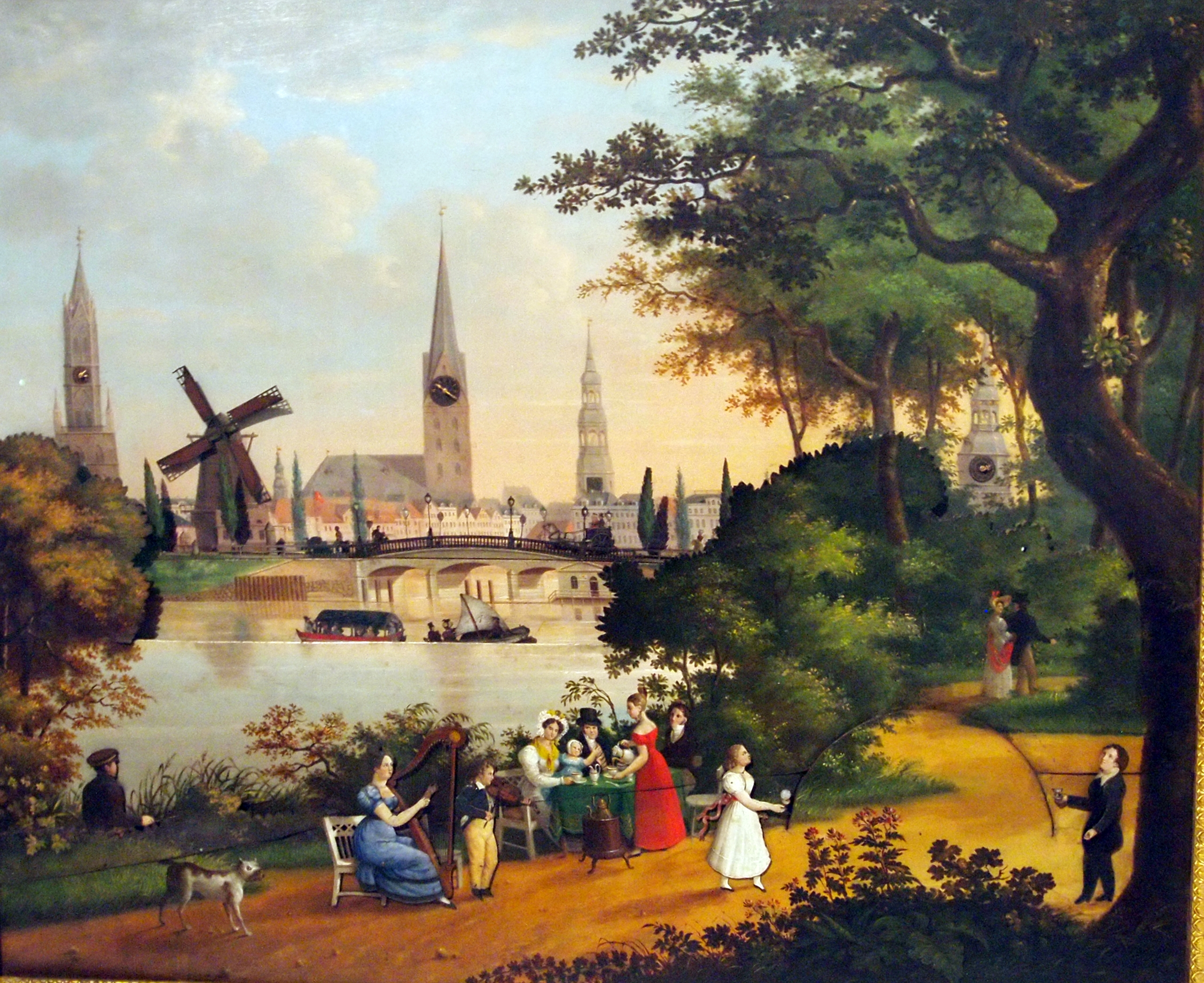
The picture clock with Alster panorama (c. 1830) in the Hamburg Museum depicts the Außenalster with the then-wooden Lombardsbrücke and one of the last remaining windmills on the Wallring.

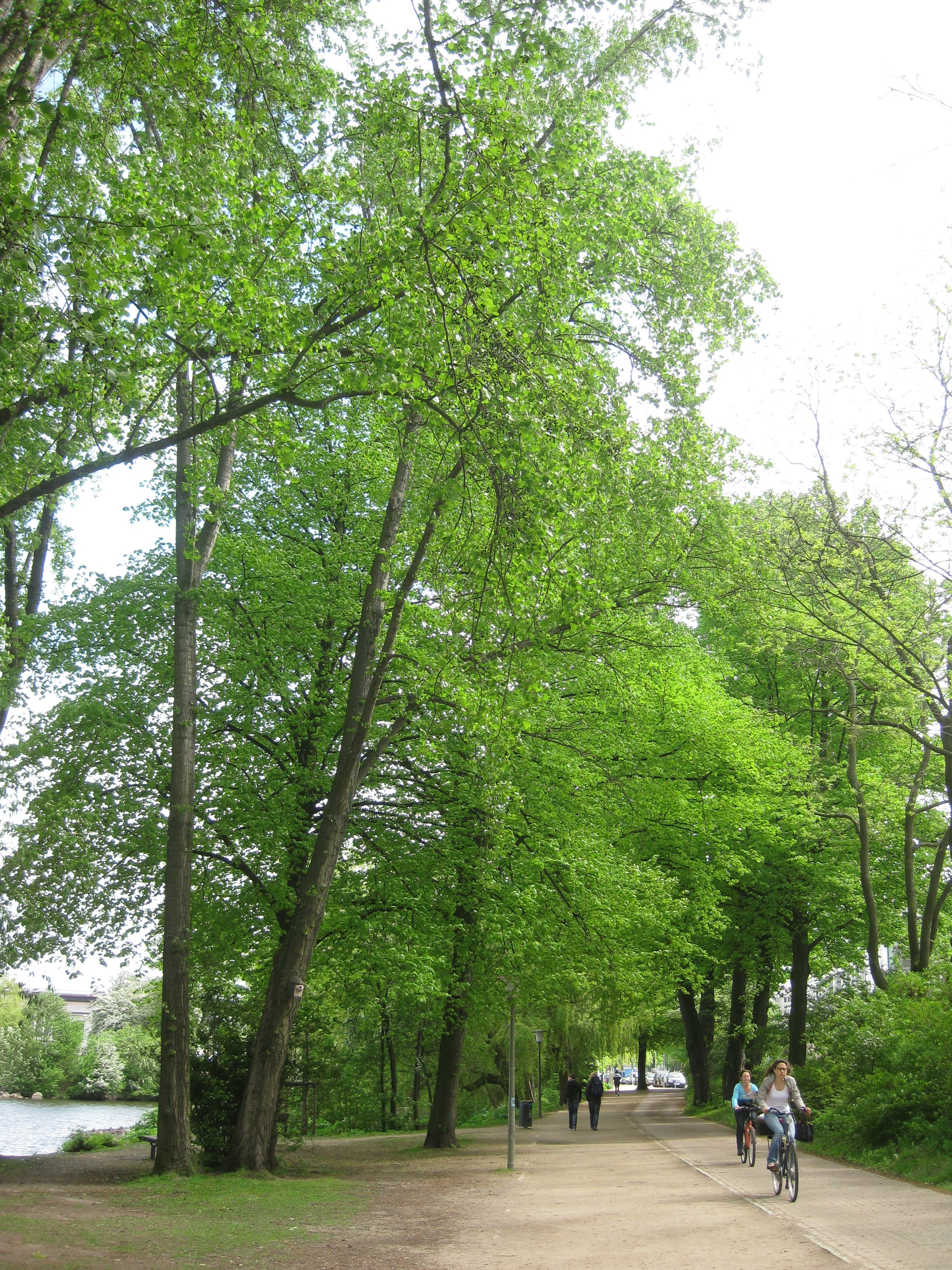
Cyclists at Alsterpark

=== History ===
The phrase "outer" refers to the former Wallanlagen (city walls) of Hamburg. The Außenalster was the part of the lake that was "outside" the city walls, built in 1625. In 1804 city wall and ramparts were stripped down and re-naturalized to parks, but the spatial division between the two lakes was retained. Today, two car and rail bridges, the Lombardsbrücke and the Kennedybrücke, span the river at this location. The areas around the Außenalster developed slightly different on the eastern and western sides; while the western side became a wealthy suburban area around the late 18th century, much of the eastern side used to be a property of the finance department of the City of Hamburg and only developed in the later decades of the 19th century.

During World War II, the Binnenalster got covered in camouflage to pose as another part of the inner city. The purpose of the mostly wooden covering was to make it harder for incoming bomber planes to navigate (in the hopes that the Binnenalster would get bombed instead of the actual inner city). A fake Lombardsbrücke was also added to the Außenalster together with an anti-aircraft unit.

=== Geography ===
The Außenalster has a size of 1.64 square kilometres (164 hectares) and is on average only some 2.5 metres (8.2 feet) deep. It is fed by the rivers Alster, Osterbek (via Osterbekkanal) and Wandse (via Mundsburger Kanal). Other canals entering the Außenalster include Rondeelkanal, Goldbekkanal and Uhlenhorster Kanal. The lake also forms a number of smaller bays and inlets. The Alster River enters the Außenalster in the North at Krugkoppelbrücke and leaves it in the South at Kennedybrücke.

=== Location ===
Districts bordering the Außenalster are Harvestehude and Rotherbaum on the western shore, and Winterhude, Uhlenhorst, Hohenfelde and St. Georg on the eastern shore. Many of the streets around Außenalster are among the most desirable addresses in Hamburg. St. Georg, as part of Hamburg-Mitte, has a notably denser built environment; all other districts around Außenalster are primarily residential districts, with many of the villas around the lake also being used by various organizations or small professional businesses. Alsterufer and Harvestehuder Weg on the western shore include a number of consular missions, like the U.S. Consulate General. For its proximity to the inner city and its recreational qualities, the Außenalster is location of a number of hotels: among others, five-star superior Hotel Atlantic lies near the south-eastern bay of Außenalster; another hotel of the same category is currently under construction at Fontenay on the western shore.

== Festivals, recreation and sport ==
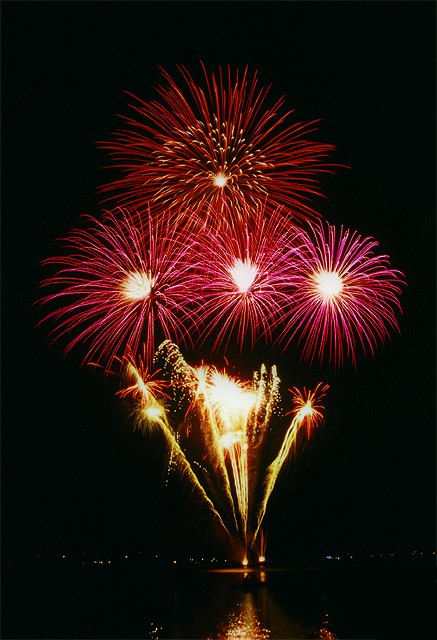
Kirschblütenfest fireworks

=== Festivals ===
Usually during May, the Japanese community in Hamburg organizes the annual Kirschblütenfest (Cherry Blossom Festival) around Außenalster. Less regularly − that is, only when a winter becomes cold enough and the Außenalster's ice strong enough − the Alstereisvergnügen is held on the frozen Alster.

=== Alsterpark ===
Almost all banks of the Außenalster are public. Formerly private gardens on the western side were made public while Hamburg was host to the Internationale Gartenbauausstellung (International Horticulture Show, IGA) in 1953. The banks vary from a small strip of green to large public parks (e.g. the Alstervorland). The 7.6 kilometres (4.7 miles) long pathway around the lake is very popular for joggers.

=== Water sports ===
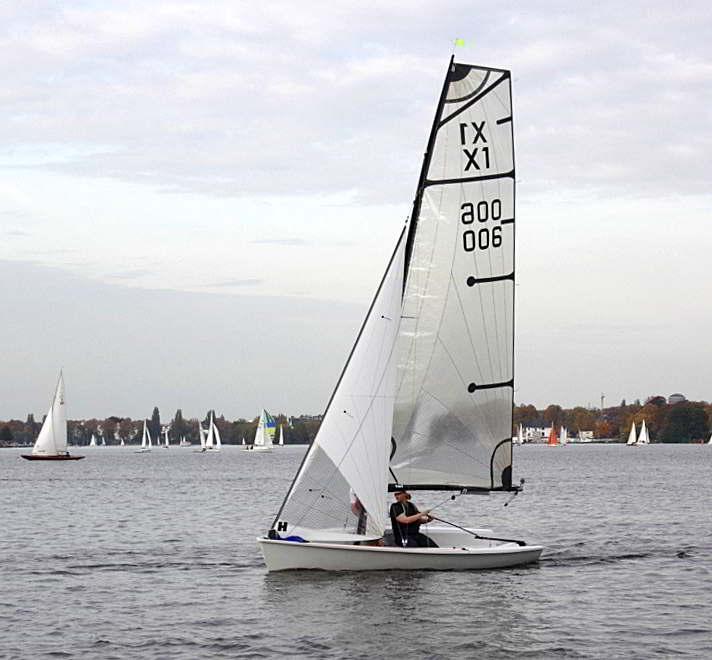
Sailing on Außenalster

Because of frequently occurring gusts, the lake is considered no easy sailing area. The Alster's water is regularly tested for quality, and considered "very clean" by German standards. Nevertheless, swimming is not recommended, because of the density of watercraft and an oftentimes shallow vision. A number of famous, long-standing sailing and rowing clubs are based around Außenalster: like Der Hamburger und Germania Ruder Club (est. 1836), Ruderclub Allemannia (est. 1866), Norddeutscher Regatta Verein (est. 1868) or Hamburger Segel-Club (est. 1926).

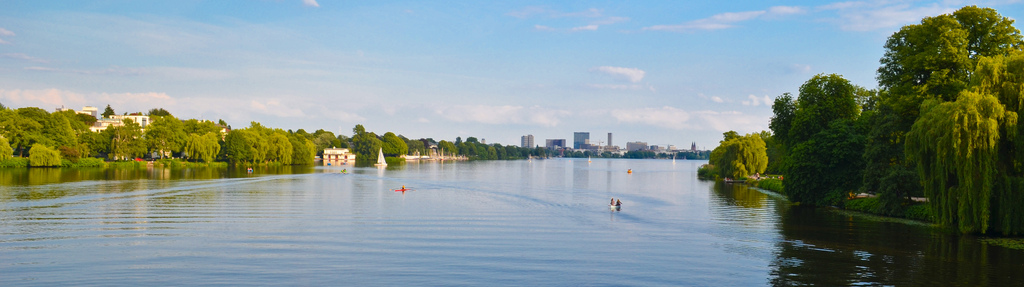
Panoramic view of the northern part of Außenalster; seen from the Fernsicht ("Far sight") shore near Krugkoppelbrücke

== See also ==
- List of lakes in Schleswig-Holstein
- List of lakes in Germany

== Notes ==
=== References ===
- Statistical office Hamburg and Schleswig-Holstein Statistisches Amt für Hamburg und Schleswig-Holstein Statistisches Jahrbuch 2006/2007 (ISSN 1614-8045)
