= Katharinenstraße 9 =

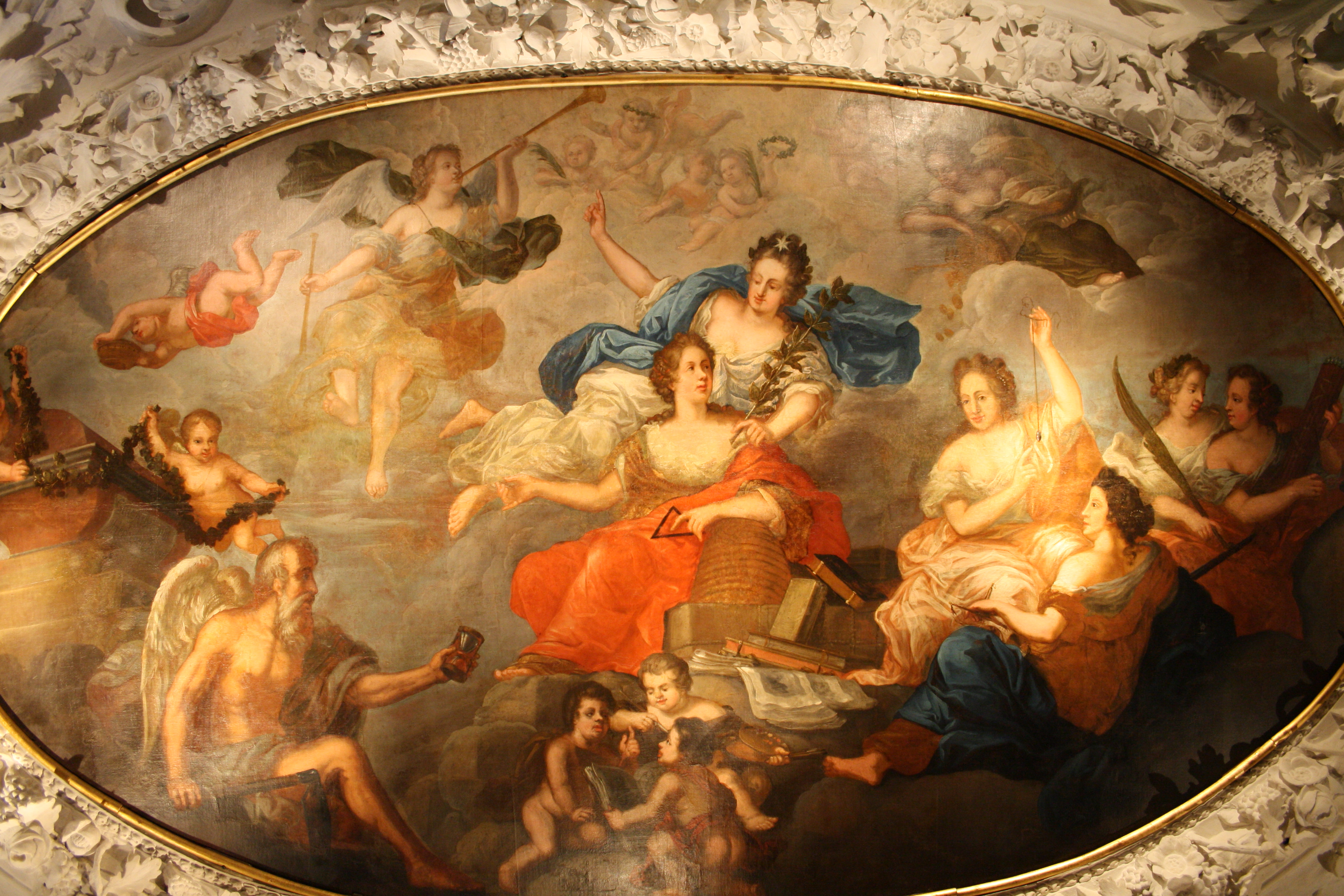
- Ceiling in the hamburgmuseum
- Interactive map of the Katharinenstraße 9 area
- Alternative names: Catharinenstraße 9

General information
- Location: Hamburg, Germany
- Coordinates: 53°32′46.2″N 9°59′26.3″E
- Construction started: c. 1630–1640
- Destroyed: 1941

Katharinenstraße 9, also Catharinenstraße 9, was a town house in the centre of Hamburg, Germany, built c. 1630–1640. In 1939 the house was added to the list of monuments in central Hamburg. It was not removed until 1954, 13 years after its destruction in 1941.

The building was known for its stucco ceiling, commissioned between 1716 and 1720 by the building's then owner (and later mayor of Hamburg) John Anderson the Elder. The stucco was most likely by the Italian Carlo Enrico Brenno, known to have worked in Hamburg and Schleswig-Holstein. The hamburgmuseum (Hamburg History Museum) has a reconstruction of the ceiling, made from a cast of the original, which includes the original central painting, by Johann Moritz Riesenberger the Younger. The painting celebrates scholarship and art. The ceiling was restored in 2004–2005.
