= Jan van Valckenborgh =

Johan van Valckenburgh
- Born: c. 1575
- Died: 1625; Voorburg, Dutch Republic

Johan van Valckenburgh (c. 1575 − 1624) was a Dutch military engineer who built fortresses. He is known for building the Bastion Henricus which was a fortification around Hamburg. Today the Hamburg History Museum is on this site.

== Biography ==
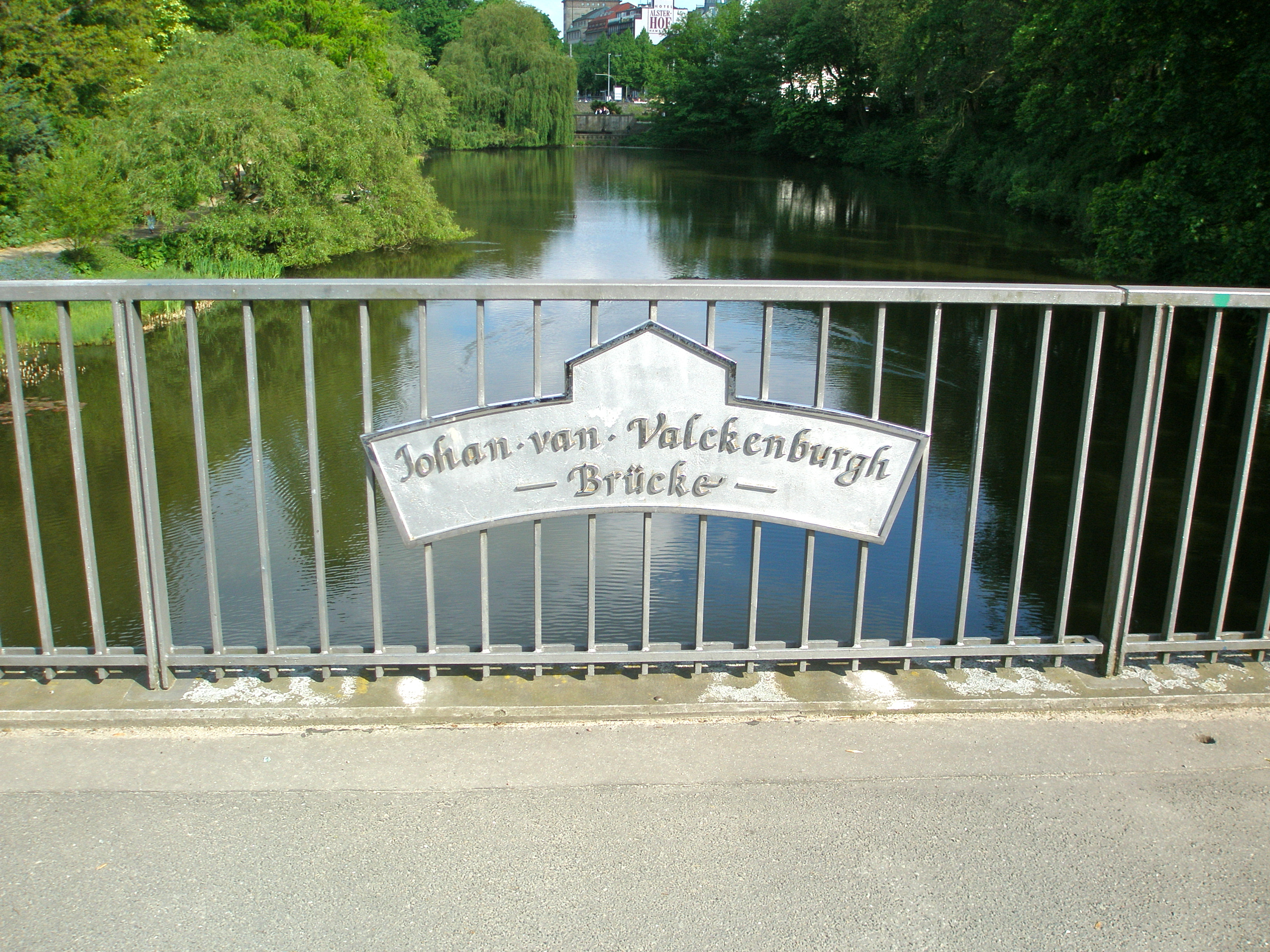
A bridge in Hamburg named in his honour

van Volckenburg was born in about 1575. He was working for Maurice of Orange in 1606 under the tutelage of Johan van Rijswijck. He was working as an engineer on his own account first within the Hanseatic League in the city of Lüneburg, but in his lifetime he is known to have worked on ten works including the waterway in Bremen. He worked on the fortifications in Hamburg from 1615 to 1625 on what became known as Bastion Henricus as well as work in Böhlau and Cologne. His work in Hamburg introduced a second layer to the fortifications to protect against the Thirty Years War. He created a "New Town" (Neustadt) whose street names still dates from the grid system of roads he introduced.

van Volckenburg died in 1625 as a Dutch soldier fighting the Spanish during the Eighty Years War in 1625. He is remembered by a plaque on Hamburg's city walls. He also has the bridge illustrated named after him and the Valckenburgschule training centre in Ulm.
