= Seebek =

River in Germany

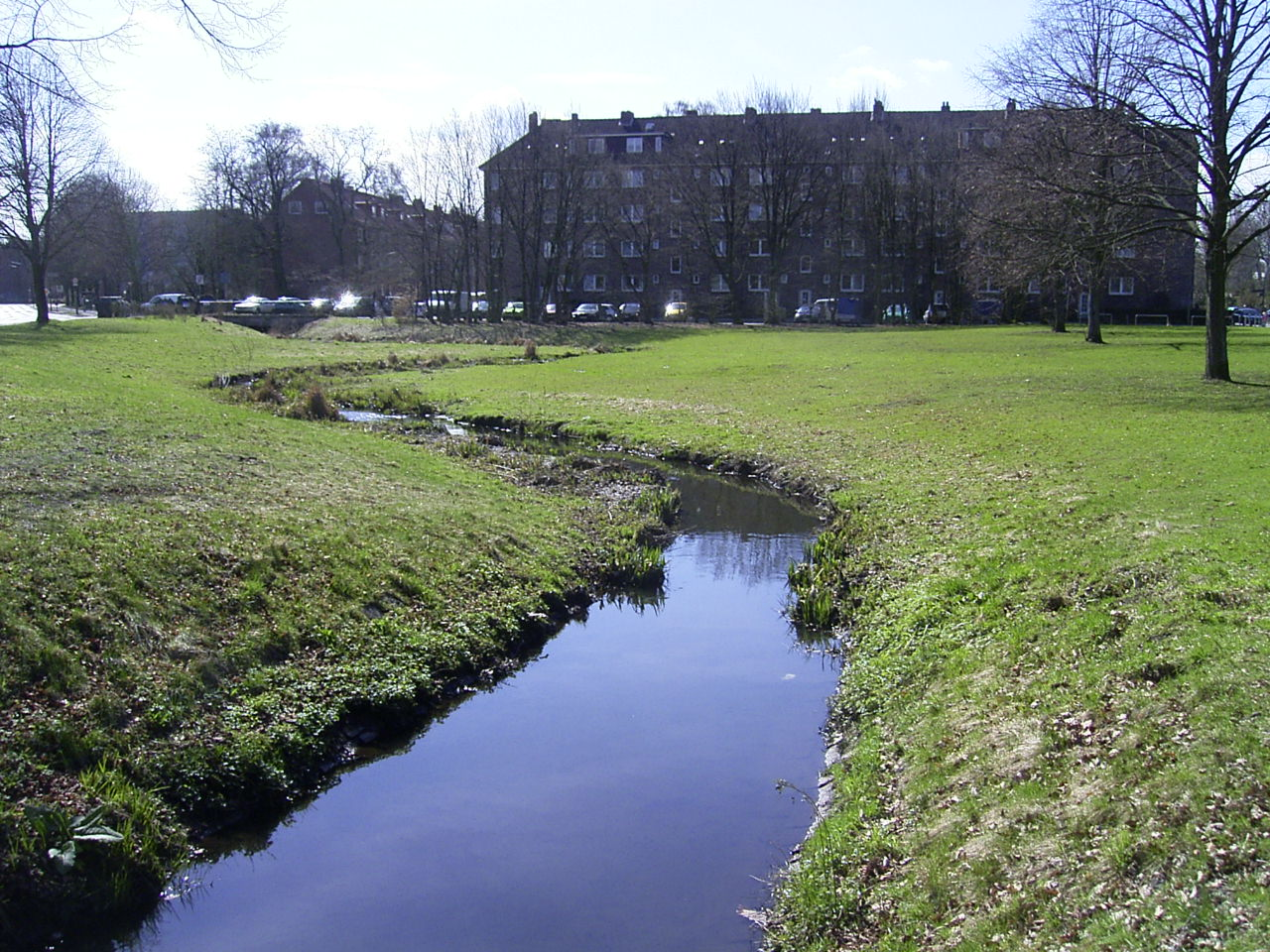
- The Seebek on the boundary of the Barmbek and Bramfeld districts of Hamburg

Location
- Country: Germany
- State: Hamburg

Physical characteristics
- Source
  - location: Bramfelder See
- Mouth
  - location: Osterbek
  - coordinates: 53.5900°N 10.0654°E

Basin features
- Progression: Osterbek→ Alster→ Elbe→ North Sea

The Seebek (German pronunciation: [ˈzeːbeːk]) is a small stream in Hamburg, Germany, which flows from the lake of the Bramfelder See in a southerly direction.

After about 3 kilometres it discharges into the Osterbek river. The stream is also known locally as the Grenzbach ('border stream', as it forms the boundary between the Bramfeld and Barmbek-Nord quarters in Hamburg). It has a good water quality. In the 1980s the streambed was largely returned to a near-natural condition after it had previously largely degenerated into a concrete drainage ditch. Today the stream provides an outstanding habitat for many small animals. The process of renaturisation had not finished; since March 2005 NABU has run Project Eisvogel (Eisvogel = 'kingfisher') especially to improve the water flow through the Seebek.

Since 1959 Seebek has also been the name of a steamer on the Alster river.

== See also ==
- List of rivers of Hamburg
