= Gottfried Libalt =

German painter

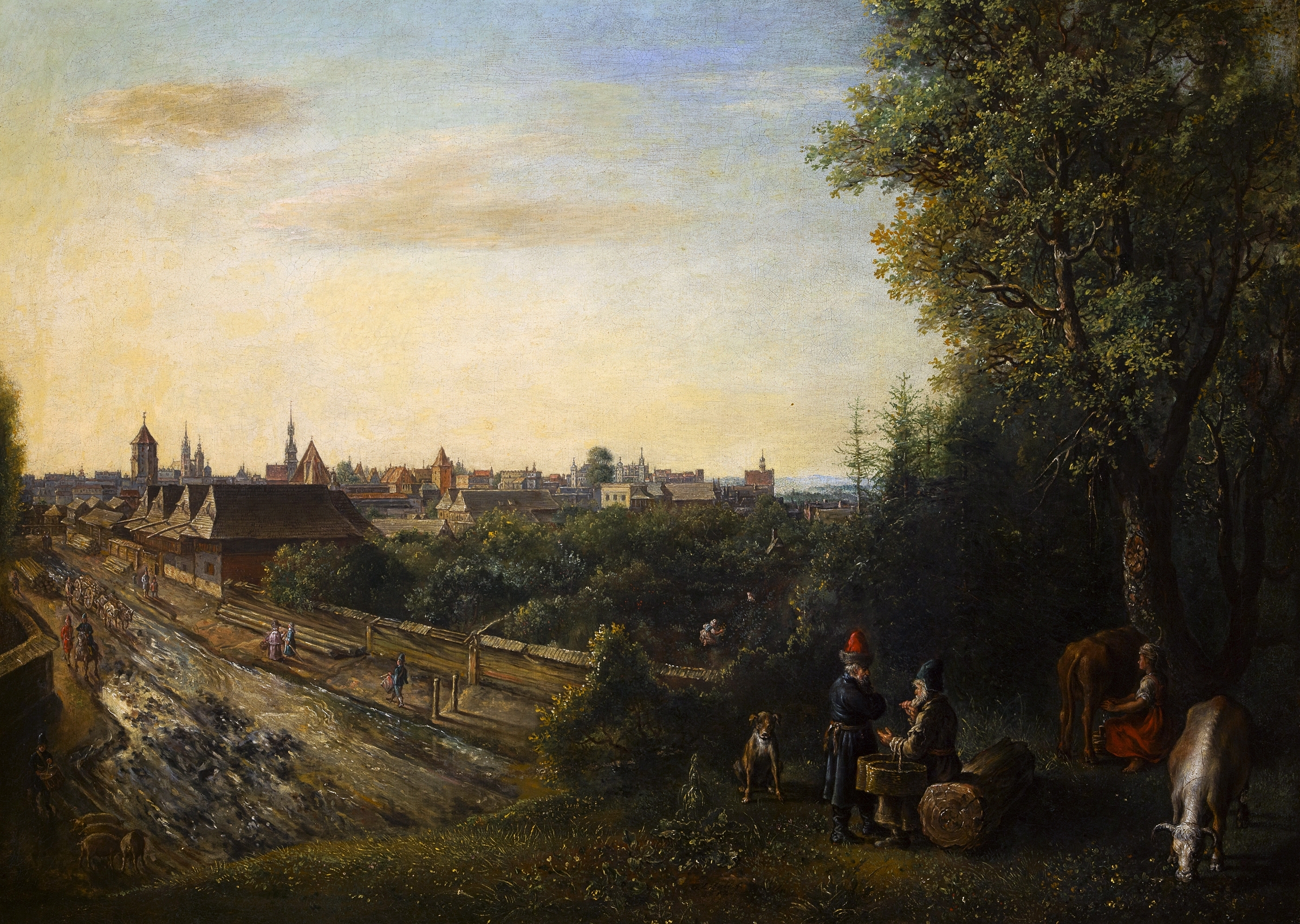
View of Kraków

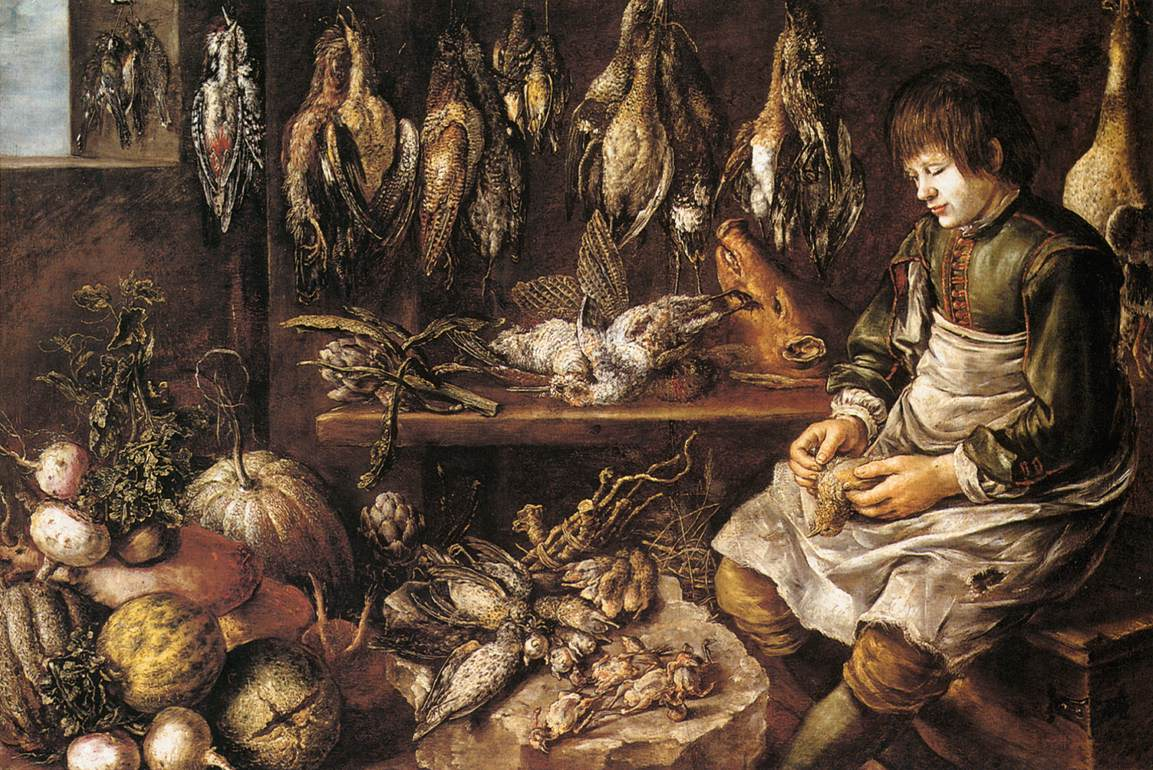
Still-life with Game Birds

Gottfried Libalt (1610/11 – 1 May 1673) was a German painter in the Mannerist style; known mostly for still-lifes, although he also did landscapes and portraits. He worked in Hamburg, Kraków and Vienna. Around 1660, he also spent a short time in Flanders, perhaps working with Philips Wouwerman. This has resulted in some sources referring to him as a Dutch painter.

== Life and work ==
He was born in Hamburg. In 1652, he painted a panoramic view of Kraków. In 1655, he did an altarpiece on the Crucifixion for a church in the village of Jaidhof in Waldviertel. Other works are in the Czech Republic and Slovakia. Many are only known through documents in the archives of aristocratic families. His still lifes are of the Central European type, but he often personalized them for his major clients, such as Archduke Leopold Wilhelm of Austria.

The only documented event of his life was his death, in Vienna, at the home of Johann Kunibert von Wentzelsberg (?-1684), an art collector who worked as an agent for Karl II von Liechtenstein-Kastelkorn.

In 1977, his painting "Adoration of the Christ Child" (1649) at St. Peter's Church, Hamburg, was sprayed with sulfuric acid and seriously damaged by the serial vandal, Hans-Joachim Bohlmann, who caused various degrees of damage to more than fifty paintings over the course of thirty years. The painting underwent a comprehensive restoration and was returned to its original place in 2001.
