= Otto Lauffer =

German cultural historian and folklorist

- Born: Otto Lauffer; 20 February 1874; Weende, now part of Göttingen
- Died: 8 August 1949 (aged 75); Hamburg
- Resting place: Ohlsdorf Cemetery, location R9 (29-30) approx. 53°37′18″N 10°2′16″E
- Occupations: Folklorist; Cultural historian

Academic background
- Education: University of Göttingen
- Doctoral advisor: Moritz Heyne

Otto Lauffer (20 February 1874 – 8 August 1949) was a German folklorist and cultural historian.

== Life ==
Otto Lauffer was born in Weende (which is today a district of Göttingen) on 20 February 1874 and spent his childhood there, until 1886.

He studied German language and literature studies, history and art history in Göttingen (enrolled on 22 August 1891), Berlin, Munich and again in Göttingen (enrolled 24 April 1894). In 1896 he was awarded his doctorate under the supervision of Moritz Heyne.

In 1902, Lauffer became an assistant at the Historical Museum in Frankfurt, and in 1907 he was the director of the same museum. From 1908 until the opening in 1922, he oversaw the building of the Museum for Hamburg History, continuing in his role as director until 1946.

In the same year that the University of Hamburg was founded, Otto Lauffer was granted the first professorship in folklore in Germany, which he retained until 1939. In 1922/23, he was also rector of the University.

Lauffer died on 8 August 1949 in Hamburg, and was buried in the Ohlsdorf Cemetery there (grave reference: R9 (29-30)). His collected works are to be found in the Hamburg University Library. On 20 February 1984, a memorial plaque was dedicated to his memory in Weende.

The Otto-Lauffer-Straße in Weende and the steamer Otto Lauffer in Hamburg are named after him.
