= Binnenalster =

- Inner Alster
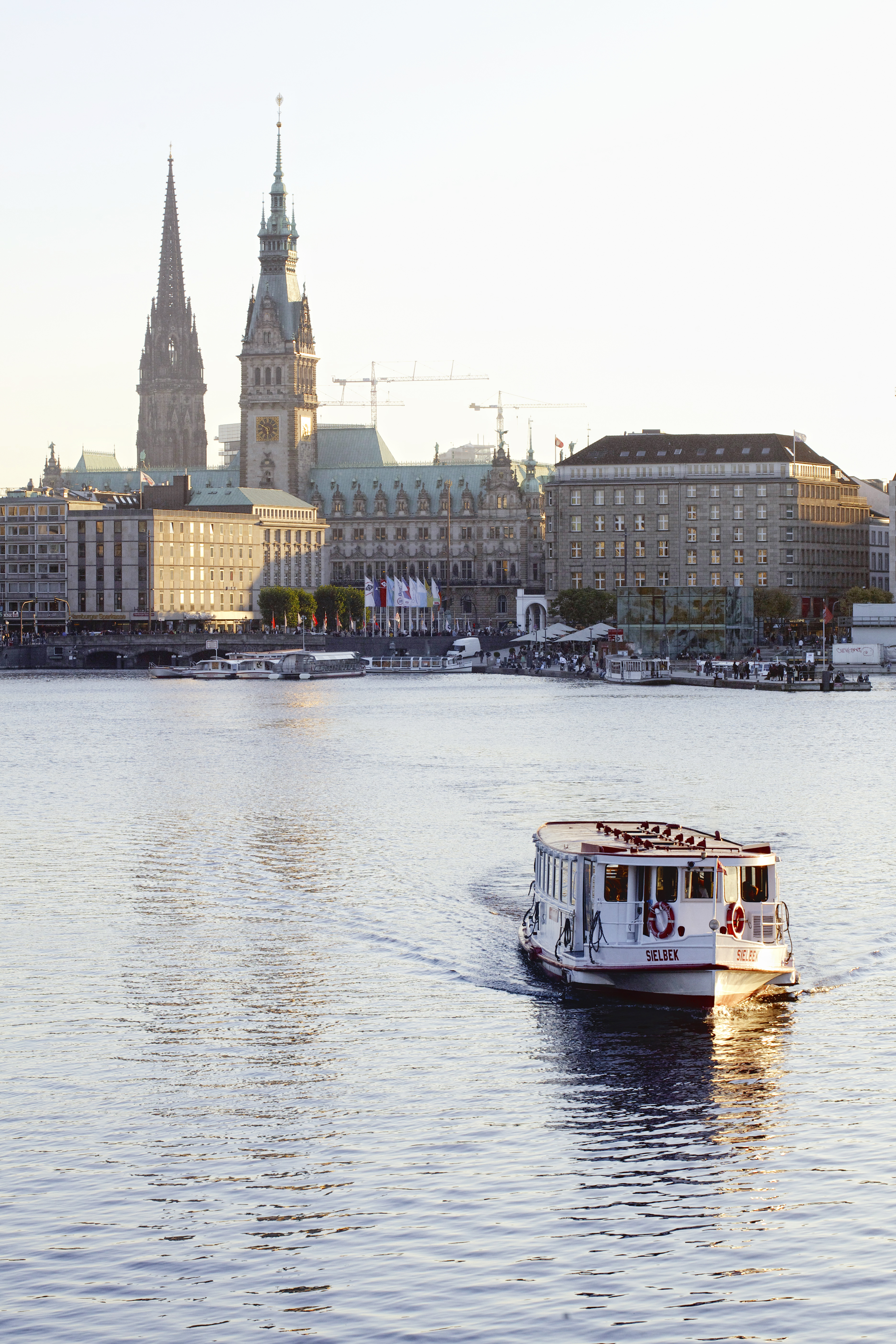
- The emblematic view from Lombardsbrücke; Jungfernstieg and Rathaus in the background

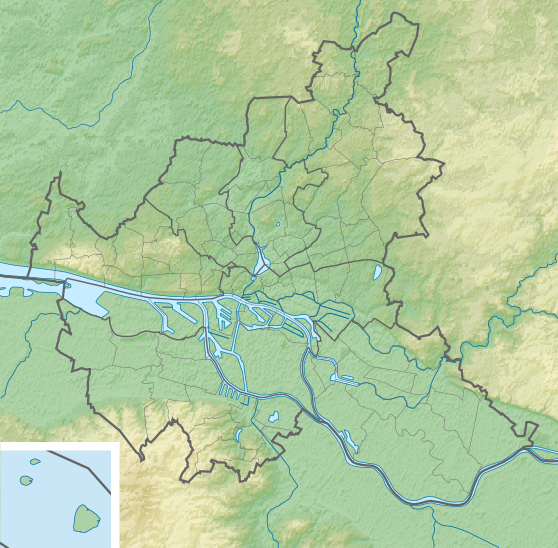
- Location within Hamburg
- Location: Hamburg
- Coordinates: 53°33′18″N 9°59′42″E
- Type: artificial lake
- Primary inflows: Alster (Außenalster)
- Primary outflows: Alster (Kleine Alster)
- Basin countries: Germany
- Surface area: 0.2 km^{2} (20 ha)
- Average depth: 2.0 m (6.6 ft)
- Max. depth: 3.0 m (9.8 ft)

Binnenalster (pronounced [ˈbɪnənˌʔalstɐ]) or Inner Alster Lake is the smaller of the two artificial lakes formed by the Alster river in Hamburg, Germany, the other being the Außenalster. The main annual festival is the Alstervergnügen.

The lake has an area of 0.2 square kilometres (0.077 sq mi).

== Overview ==
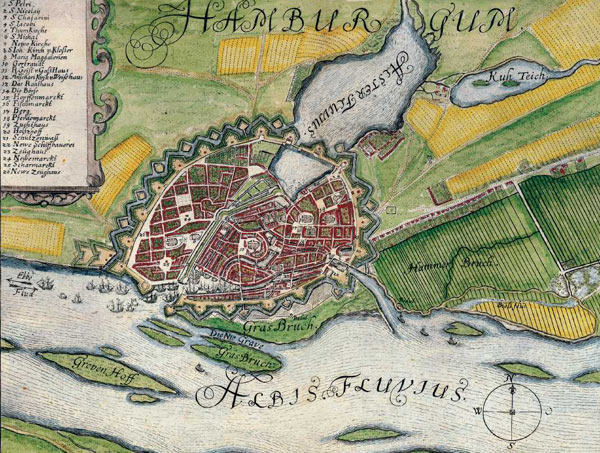
Map of Hamburg around 1660

=== History ===
The phrase "inner" refers to the old city walls of Hamburg. The Binnenalster was the part of the lake that was "inside" the city walls. The lake was originally created to serve as a reservoir for a mill.

During World War II, the Binnenalster got covered in camouflage to pose as another part of the inner city. The purpose of the mostly wooden covering was to make it harder for incoming bomber planes to navigate (in the hopes that the Binnenalster would get bombed instead of the actual inner city). A fake Lombardsbrücke was also added to the Außenalster together with an anti-aircraft unit.

As of 2008 the old city walls do not exist, instead two car and train bridges, the Lombardsbrücke and the Kennedybrücke, span the river.

=== Location ===
The Binnenalster is bordered by embankment streets on three sides, only the northern side is bordered by a park. Jungfernstieg – on the southern side, opposite this park is a busy boulevard and center of the Binnenalster. Left and right, Ballindamm and Neuer Jungfernstieg accommodate a number of corporate headquarters and first class hotels.

== Public events ==
=== Alstervergnügen ===
The Alstervergnügen (English: Alster enjoyment) is an annual street fair held around the lake. It always takes place throughout the first weekend of September, and offers a wide variety of food, drink, vending and games stands, as well as some rock bands.

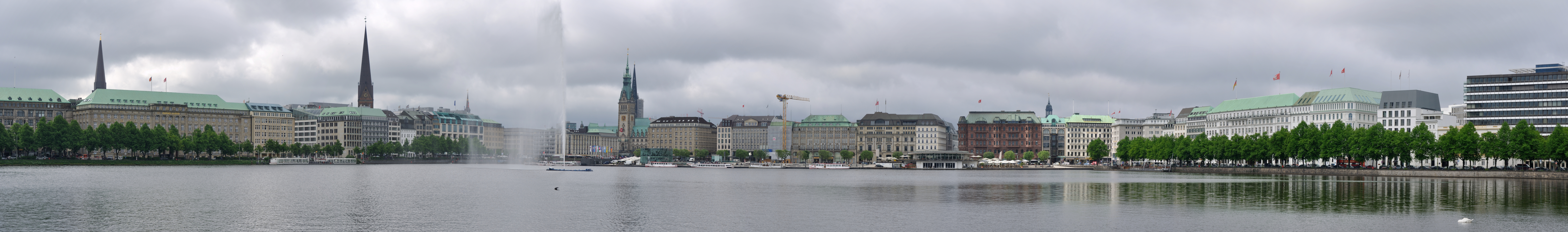
Binnenalster on a cloudy day

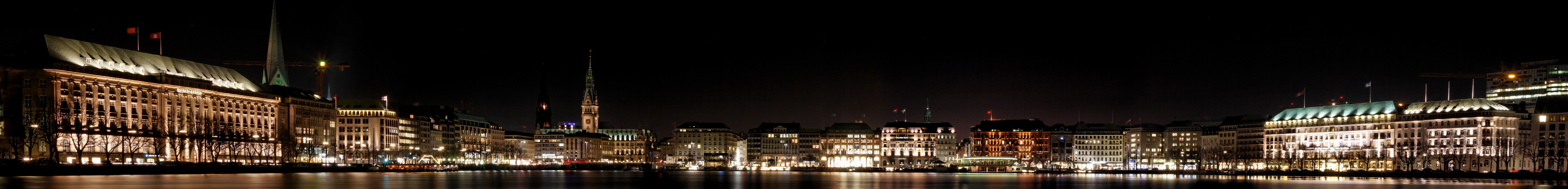
Binnenalster at night

== See also ==
- List of lakes in Schleswig-Holstein
- List of lakes in Germany

== Notes ==
=== References ===
- Statistical office Hamburg and Schleswig-Holstein Statistisches Amt für Hamburg und Schleswig-Holstein (2007). "Statistisches Jahrbuch 2006/2007" (PDF). Statistisches Jahrbuch Hamburg. Hamburg, Germany: Statistisches Amt für Hamburg und Schleswig-Holstein. ISSN 1614-8045.
