= Church of Saint Peter, Hamburg =

Saint Peter's Church Hauptkirche St. Petri
- Petrikirche
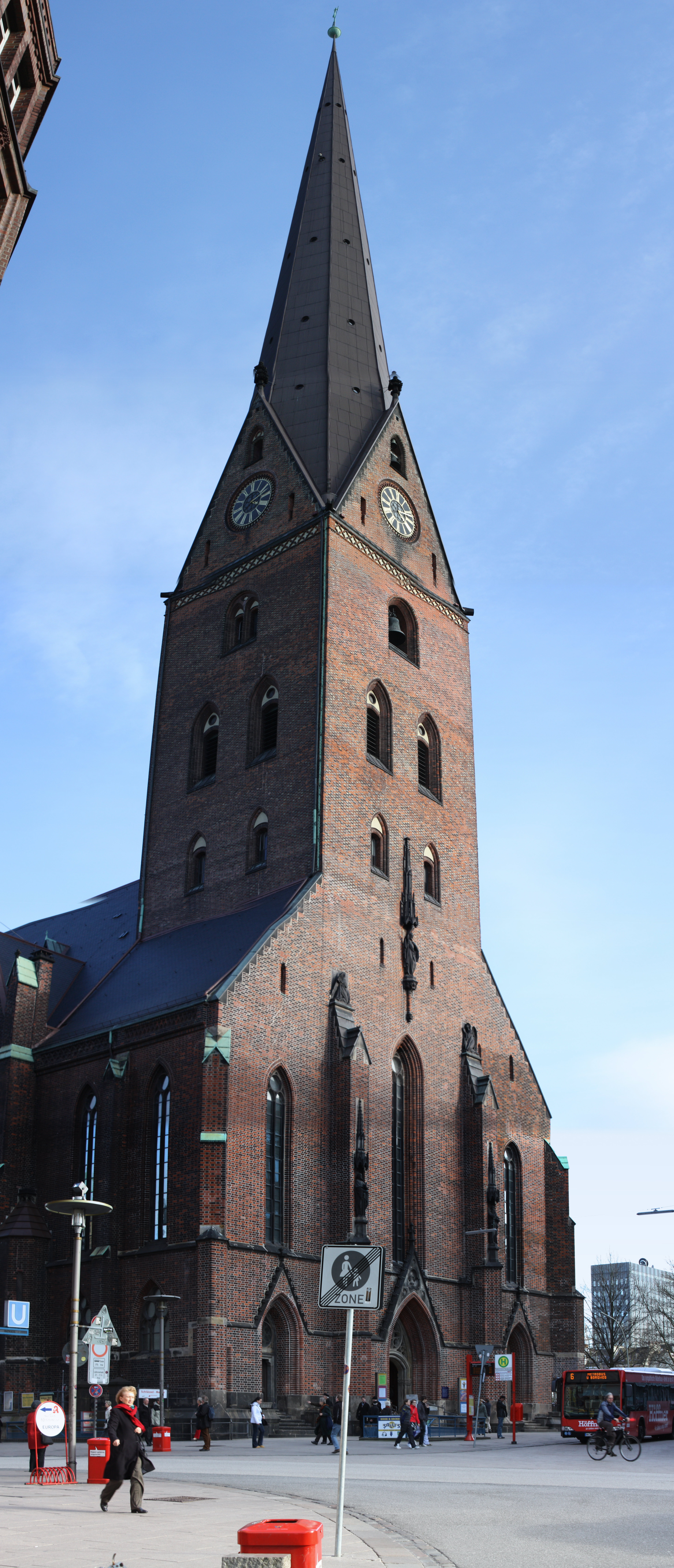
- Bell tower of the church

- Location within Hamburg Location within Germany

General information
- Type: Lutheran Church
- Architectural style: Gothic
- Location: Hamburg, Germany
- Coordinates: 53°33′01″N 9°59′47″E
- Construction started: 1189
- Completed: 1195
- Renovated: 1418 & 1878

Height
- Height: 132 m (433 ft)

Saint Peter's Church (German: Hauptkirche St. Petri, German coll.: Petrikirche) in Hamburg, Germany stands on the site of many former cathedrals. It has been a Protestant cathedral since the Reformation and its congregation forms part of the Evangelical Lutheran Church in Northern Germany.

== History ==
It is believed that the church is near the original Hammaburg area and that a previous church or cathedral existed on the site. St. Peter's was probably built in early 1189; it was first documented in 1195 as a market church or ecclesia forensis. About 1310 it was rebuilt in a Gothic style and was completed around 1418. The bronze lion-head door handles, the oldest work of art of Hamburg, date from the foundation of the tower in 1342.

The tower, topped with a new copper-covered spire in 1516, at 127.5 m towered above even that of the neighbouring Hamburg Cathedral, but was surpassed itself already in 1518 by the tower of St. Nicholas Church at initially 135 m. Decay and political tensions caused the cathedral to be torn down between 1804 and 1807. Under the subsequent French occupation St. Peter's along with most of the other main churches in 1813 was commandeered by Napoleonic soldiers to be used as a horse stable. Only a few decades later it fell victim to the great fire that swept Hamburg in May 1842. Most works of art, such as the lion-head door handles, were saved. The St. Peter's portal gateway was heavily damaged in the fire but was saved and ended up being built into the Museum für Hamburgische Geschichte (established in 1922 and called Hamburg Museum since 2005), and the doorway itself was restored again in 1995.

Only seven years after the great fire, the Gothic church was rebuilt by architects Alexis de Chateauneuf and Hermann Peter Fersenfeldt in its previous location. In 1878, the 132 meter high church tower — its copper spire designed years earlier by Johann Hermann Maack — was finished.

In the first half of the 20th century, the parish lost many members, as residential neighborhoods were torn down to develop banks and department stores in the city center. The church got through the Second World War relatively intact. In 1962, as a nearby community center was being built, the foundations of a medieval tower, the Bischofsturm ("Bishop's Tower") were discovered.

In 1979, nuclear power protesters, including the late pastor Christoph Stoermer, occupied the cathedral. From 2005 to 2007, the west and south facades of the church were hung with giant posters advertising the H&M chain of clothing stores, thus providing funding for maintenance of the cathedral.

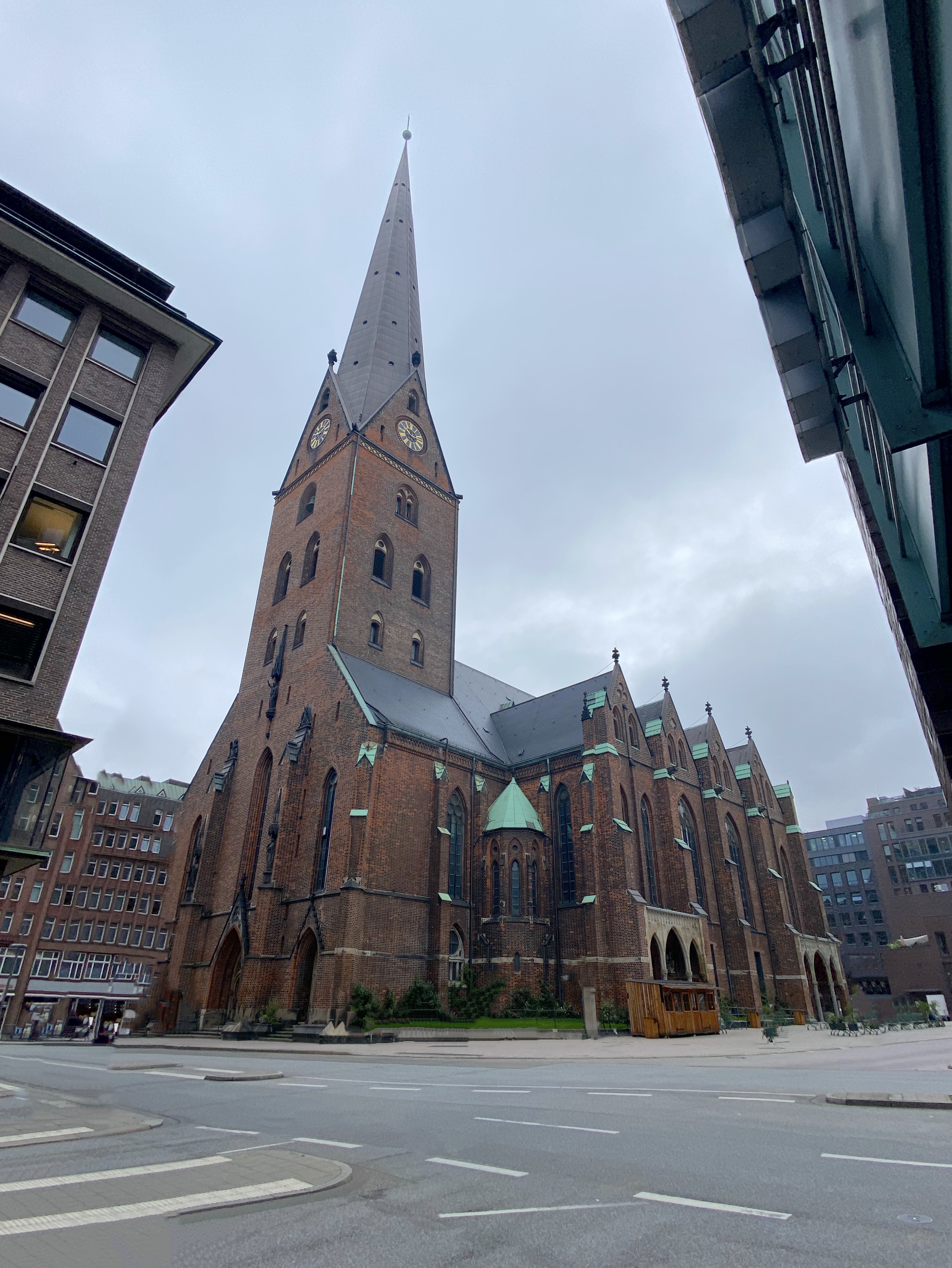
St. Petri Cathedral in Hamburg

== Art ==
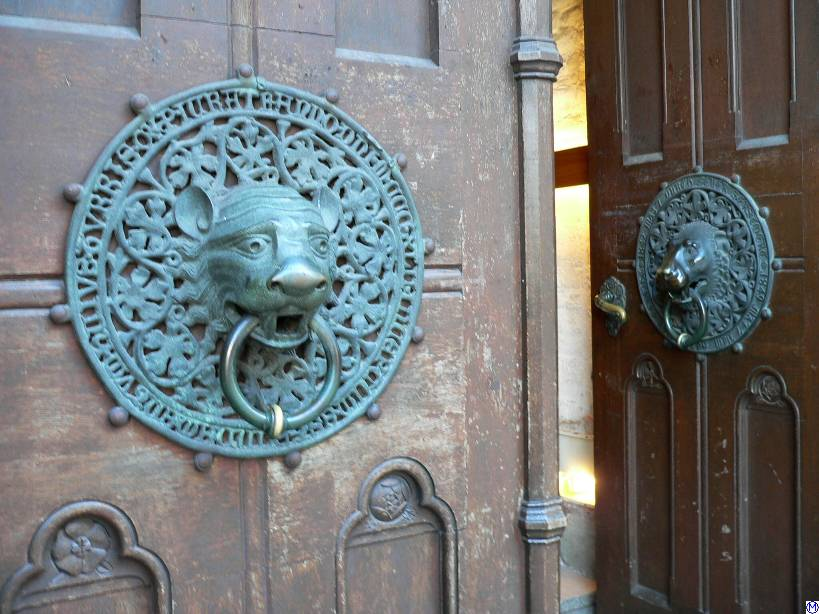
Door handles with lion heads

The best known artworks in St Peter's are the lion-head door handles, located in the left wing of the west portal. However, the cathedral contains many additional works of art.

In the north portion of the cathedral, a Gothic mural from approximately 1460 shows the first bishop Ansgar of Bremen, with the words "Apostle of the North". A column in the choir area contains a statue by Bernt Notke, from around 1480–1483, showing Archbishop Ansgar and the Hamburg Marienkirche, which he founded.

From the 17th century, there are two oil paintings by Gottfried Libalt: Jacob's Dream and Christ's Birth. They were damaged by an acid attack in 1977, but were restored in October, 2001, and returned to the cathedral.

The painting Christmas 1813 in St. Peter's is on a column in the south part of the cathedral. It shows the Hamburg citizens who, when they did not provide food to Napoleon's occupying troops, were locked in the church by the soldiers. In the front of the cathedral are neo-Gothic representations of the evangelists. A modern bronze sculpture by Fritz Fleer shows Dietrich Bonhoeffer dressed as a convict with his hands bound.

== See also ==
- Grabow Altarpiece
