= Osterbek =

River in Germany

Osterbek Osterbekkanal
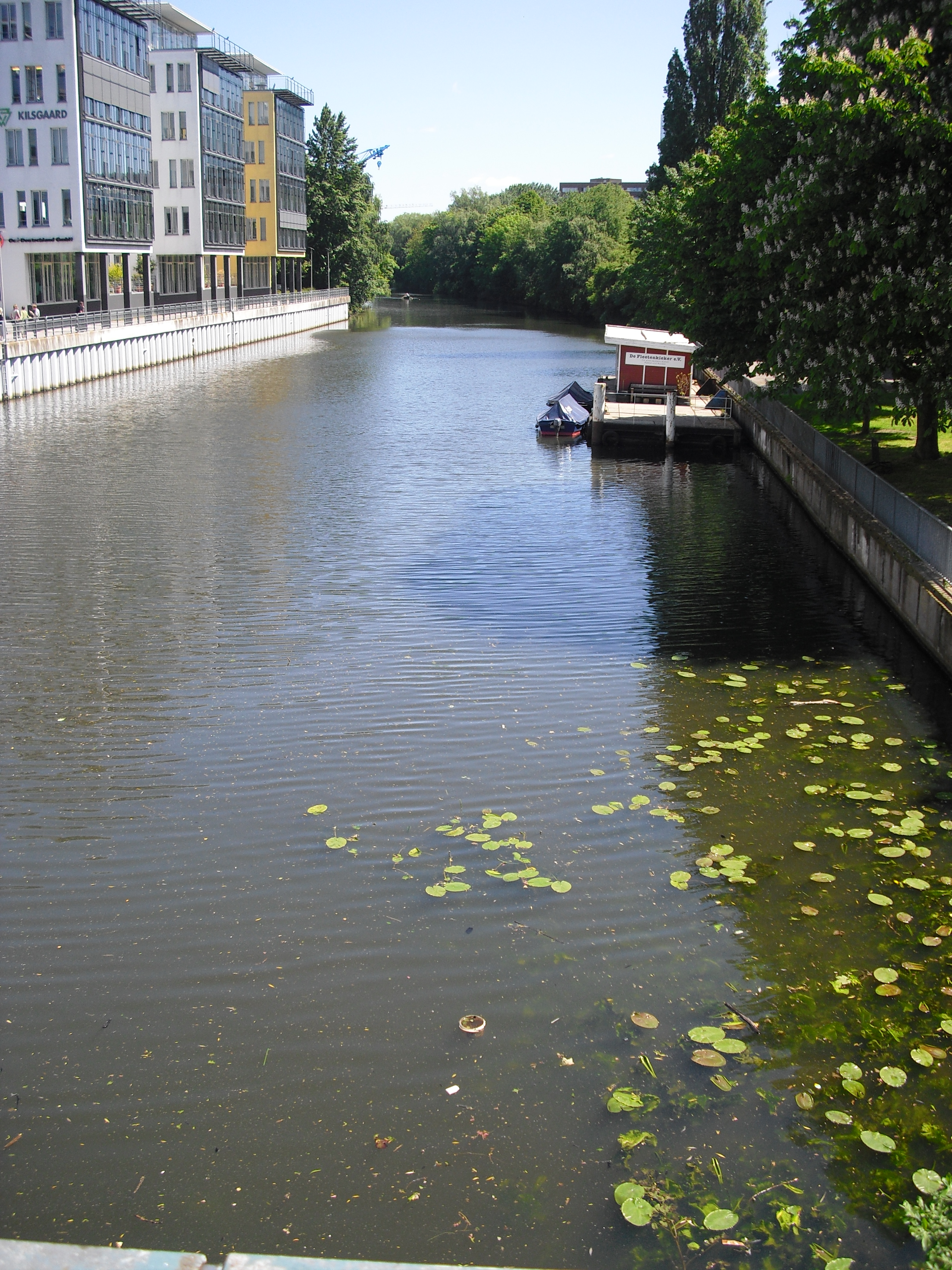
- Osterbekkanal in Hamburg

Location
- Country: Germany
- State: Hamburg

Physical characteristics
- Source
  - location: Farmsen-Berne, Hamburg
  - coordinates: 53°37′17″N 10°6′43″E
  - elevation: 20 m (66 ft)
- Mouth: Alster (Außenalster)
  - location: Winterhude, Hamburg
  - coordinates: 53°34′35″N 10°0′21″E
  - elevation: 6 m (20 ft)
- Length: 8.5 km (5.3 mi)

Basin features
- Tributaries
  - left: Hopfengraben
  - right: Seebek
- Progression: Alster→ Elbe→ North Sea

Osterbek is a river of Hamburg, Germany. The Osterbek has its source at Farmsen-Berne in the Hamburg borough of Wandsbek. After crossing into the borough of Hamburg-Nord, the Osterbek becomes navigable as Osterbekkanal. It joins the Alster at Außenalster, between the districts Winterhude and Uhlenhorst.

== See also ==
- List of rivers of Hamburg
