= Steilshoop =

Quarter in Hamburg, Germany

- Quarter of Hamburg
- Location of Steilshoop within Hamburg
- Interactive map of Steilshoop
- Location within Germany Location within Hamburg
- Coordinates: 53°36′30″N 10°03′20″E
- Country: Germany
- State: Hamburg
- City: Hamburg
- Borough: Wandsbek

Area
  - Total: 2.5 km^{2} (0.97 sq mi)

Population (2024-12-31)
  - Total: 19,902
  - Density: 8,000/km^{2} (21,000/sq mi)
- Time zone: UTC+01:00 (CET)
  - Summer (DST): UTC+02:00 (CEST)

Steilshoop (German pronunciation: [ˈʃtaɪlshoːp]) is a quarter of Hamburg, Germany, in the Wandsbek borough.
