= Museum of Hamburg History =

Museum for Hamburg History
- Museum für Hamburgische Geschichte
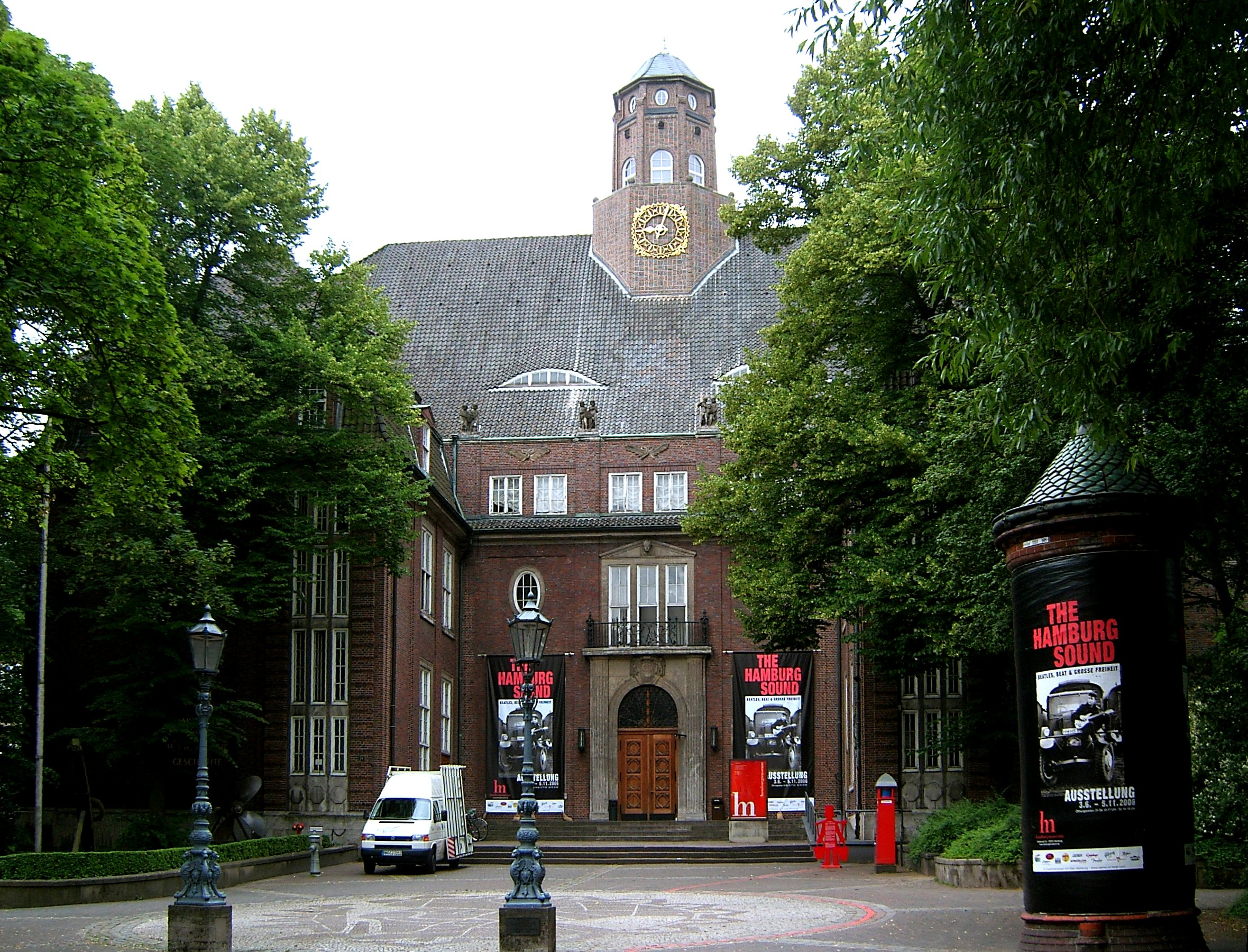
- Entrance of the museum as seen from Holstenwall
- Interactive fullscreen map
- Established: 1908
- Location: Hamburg, Germany
- Coordinates: 53°33′04″N 9°58′23″E
- Type: History museum
- Owner: Historic Museums Hamburg Foundation
- Public transit access: St. Pauli
- Website: hamburgmuseum.de

The Museum of Hamburg History (German: Museum für Hamburgische Geschichte) is a history museum located in the city of Hamburg in northern Germany. The museum was established in 1908 and opened at its current location in 1922, although its parent organization was founded in 1839. The museum is located near the Planten un Blomen park in the center of Hamburg.

== History ==
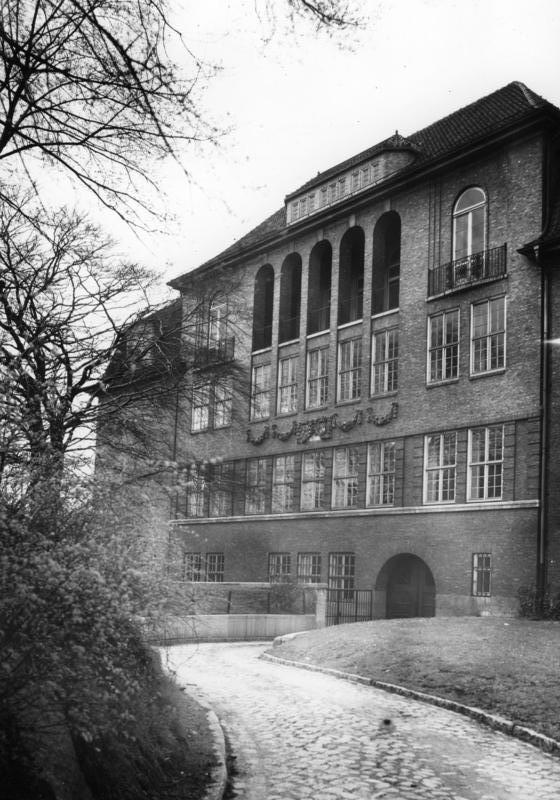
The museum in 1930

The Society of Hamburg History (Verein für Hamburgische Geschichte), founded in 1839, started compiling the Collection of Hamburg Antiquities (Sammlung Hamburger Altertümer). First exhibits included architectural fragments of the demolished St. Mary's Cathedral and two monasteries.

The main building at Holstenwall was designed by Fritz Schumacher and constructed between 1914 and 1922. The museum was built on the site of the former Bastion Henricus, a part of the baroque fortification which was erected between 1616 and 1625 by the Dutchman Jan van Valckenborgh in order to make the town impregnable.

The museum's courtyard was damaged during the Great Fire of Hamburg in 1842 and fully restored in 1995. A glass dome over the inner courtyard was completed in 1989. The glass courtyard was completed by the firm of Von Gerkan, Marg and Partners. This provided more museum space without an actual new building, because it allowed increased use of the courtyard. The covered courtyard was actually envisioned, or at least considered, as part of the original design; however, the construction of the covering was deferred. The design uses a steel gridshell.

The Hamburg Observatory occupied the museum's current site from 1825 to 1912 before being moved to Bergedorf. The area was part of the old city wall defences built by the Dutchman Jan van Valckenborgh. These walls were part of Bastion Henricus, which was a baroque fortification built between 1616 and 1625. The museum was formerly located at the Johanneum school.

The museum became state-owned under the direction of Otto Lauffer in the early 1900s, though this was changed back in 1999.

The museum adopted the name hamburgmuseum, and initials hm, in 2006. In 2008, the museum started a program called hm freunde (Society of Friends of the Museum of Hamburg History).

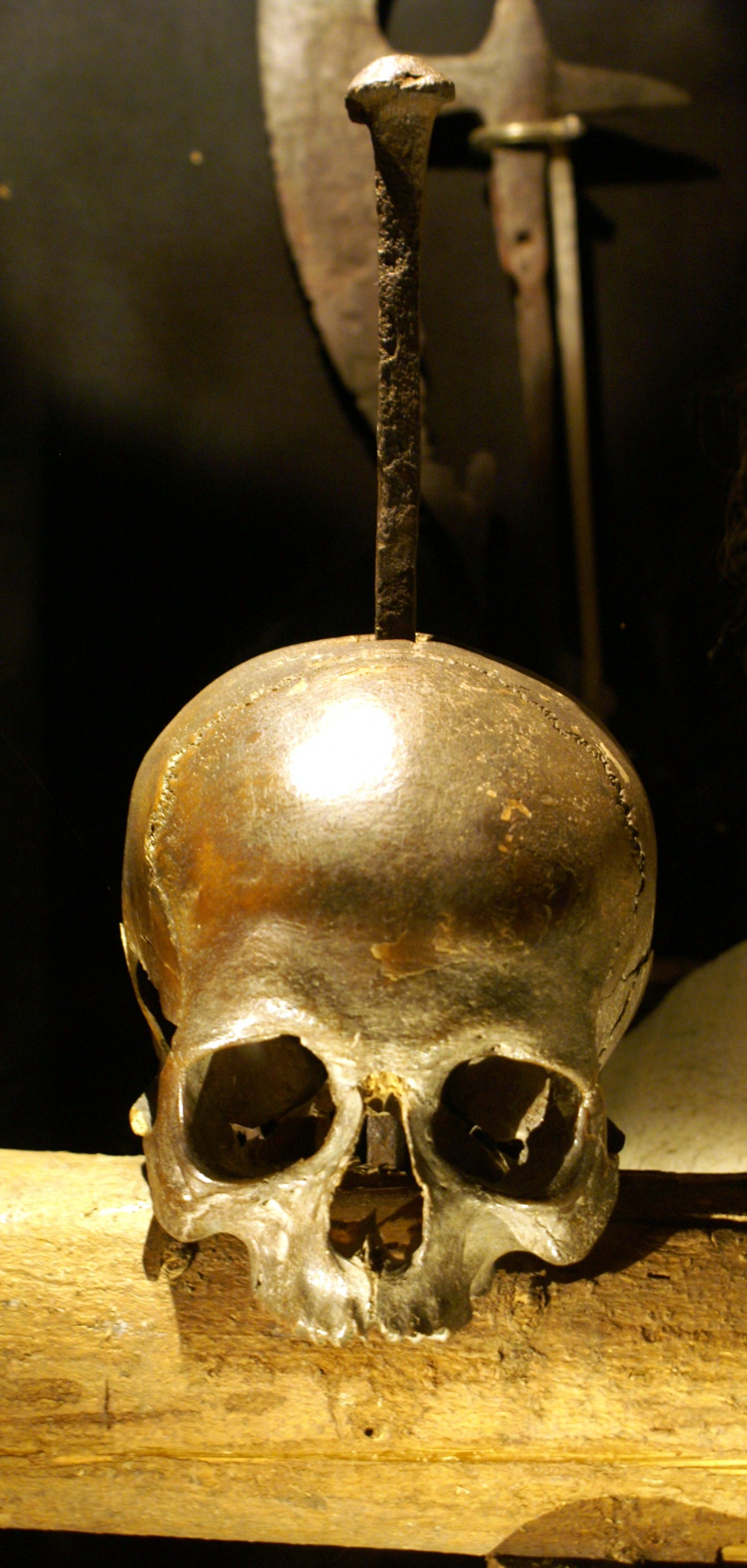
The pirate skull with its famous nail

In 2010, a pirate skull with a nail in it was stolen from the museum. The skull was discovered in 1878, and based on forensic analysis it is believed to be from the 1400s. At that time, it was common for pirates to be executed by being beheaded, and then the skull would be put on an iron stake to display the consequences of this activity. A more precise determination was attempted by the museum in 2004 by DNA analysis, but there was no further confirmation. It was thought this might be from a particular execution of 30 people during the age of the Hanseatic League. The skull was stolen on 9 January 2010, and it was thought it may be the skull of the (in)famous pirate Klaus Stoertebeker. The skull was added to the museum's collection in 1922.

In 2016, the museum was considered as a candidate for repatriation of a century-old German dog-tag. The dog-tag belonged to a soldier who had gone missing in action during World War I.

=== Exhibits in 2005 ===
Over time, there has been a gradual shift with some temporary exhibits also. These were the exhibits in and around 2005:

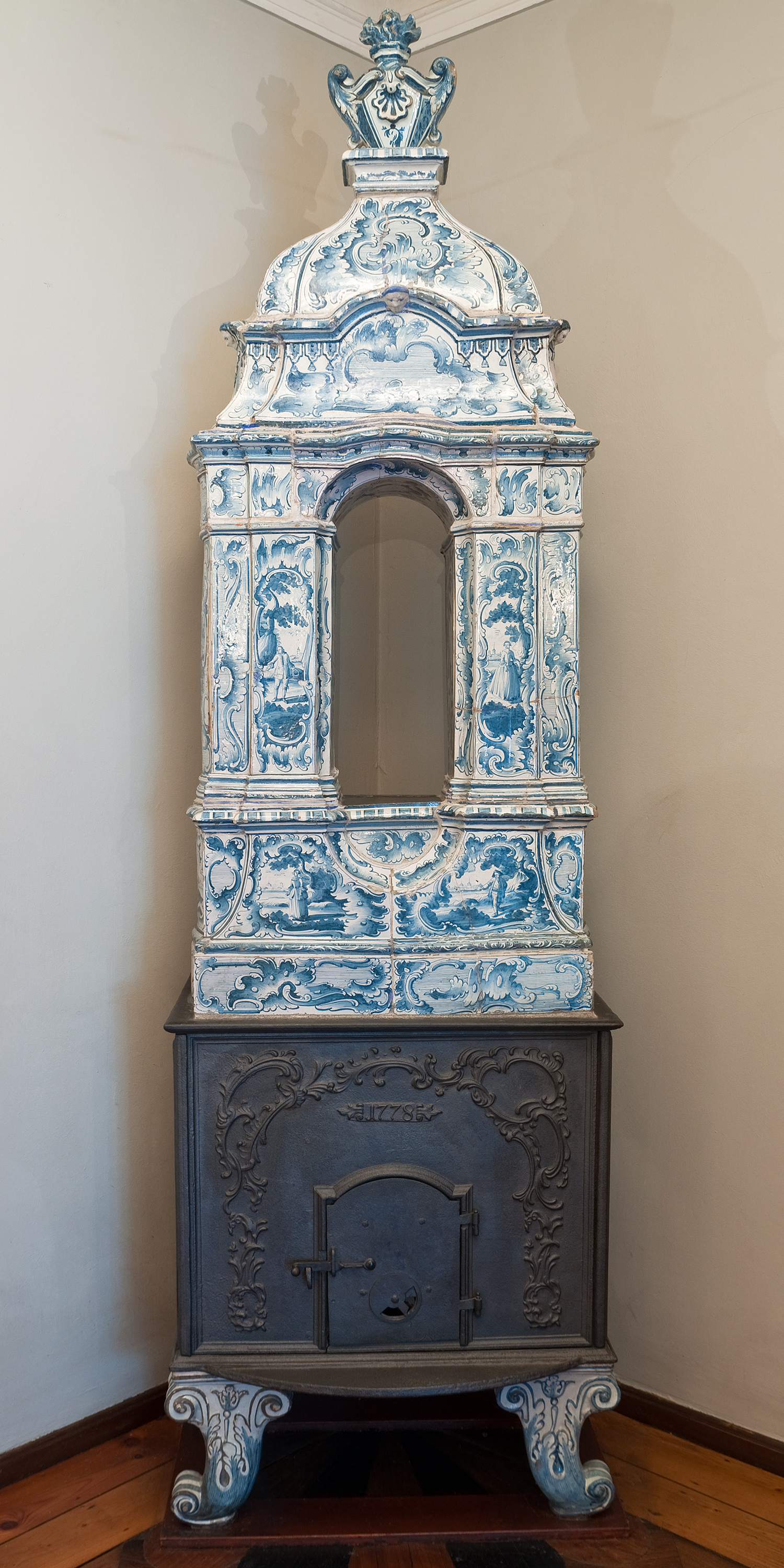
Aufsatzofen, 1778

- Kleidung und Mode: Kostüme und Kleidung in Hamburg von 1550–1920 (Clothing and fashion: costumes and clothing in Hamburg from 1550 to 1920)
- Hamburgisches Mäzenatentum: Familie Lorenz-Meyer als Beispiel (Hamburg patronage: The example of the Lorenz-Meyer family)
- Musik und Kunst in Hamburg (Music and art in Hamburg)
- Theater und Wissenschaft in Hamburg (Theatre and science in Hamburg)
- Hamburg im 20. Jahrhundert (Hamburg in the 20th century)
- Der Hamburger Börsenvorplatz von 1558 (The forecourt of the Hamburg exchange of 1558)
- Hamme, Burg und Hansestadt – Hamburg im Mittelalter (Hamme, castle and city of the Hanse – Hamburg in the Middle Ages)
- Kirchen, Kanonen und Kommerz – Hamburg in der frühen Neuzeit (Churches, cannons and commerce – Hamburg in the early modern period)
- Reformation in Hamburg (Reformation in Hamburg)
- Hamburg als Währungszentrum (Hamburg as centre of currencies)
- Das Schiffswrack von Wittenbergen (The shipwreck of Wittenbergen)
- Bauen und Wohnen und die Sicherung der Elbe vor Piraten (Constructing and living and securing the Elbe from pirates)
- Barocke Kaufmannsdiele (Baroque merchant hall)
- Stadtbild und Verfassung im 17. Jahrhundert (Townscape and constitution in the 17th century)
- Hamburg 1650–1860 (Hamburg 1650–1860)
- Die HafenCity – Hamburg im 21. Jahrhundert (The HafenCity – Hamburg in the 21st century)
- Kommandobrücke des Dampfers WERNER (The command bridge of steamboat WERNER)
- Zur Wohnkultur (About home decor)
- Geschichte der Juden in Hamburg (History of the Jews in Hamburg)
- Klopstockzimmer (The Klopstock room)
- Barocke Wohnräume (Baroque living rooms)
- Kunsthandwerk und Wohnkultur (Handicraft and home decor)
- 1945. Kriegsende in Hamburg (1945. End of the war in Hamburg)

== Interior and contents ==
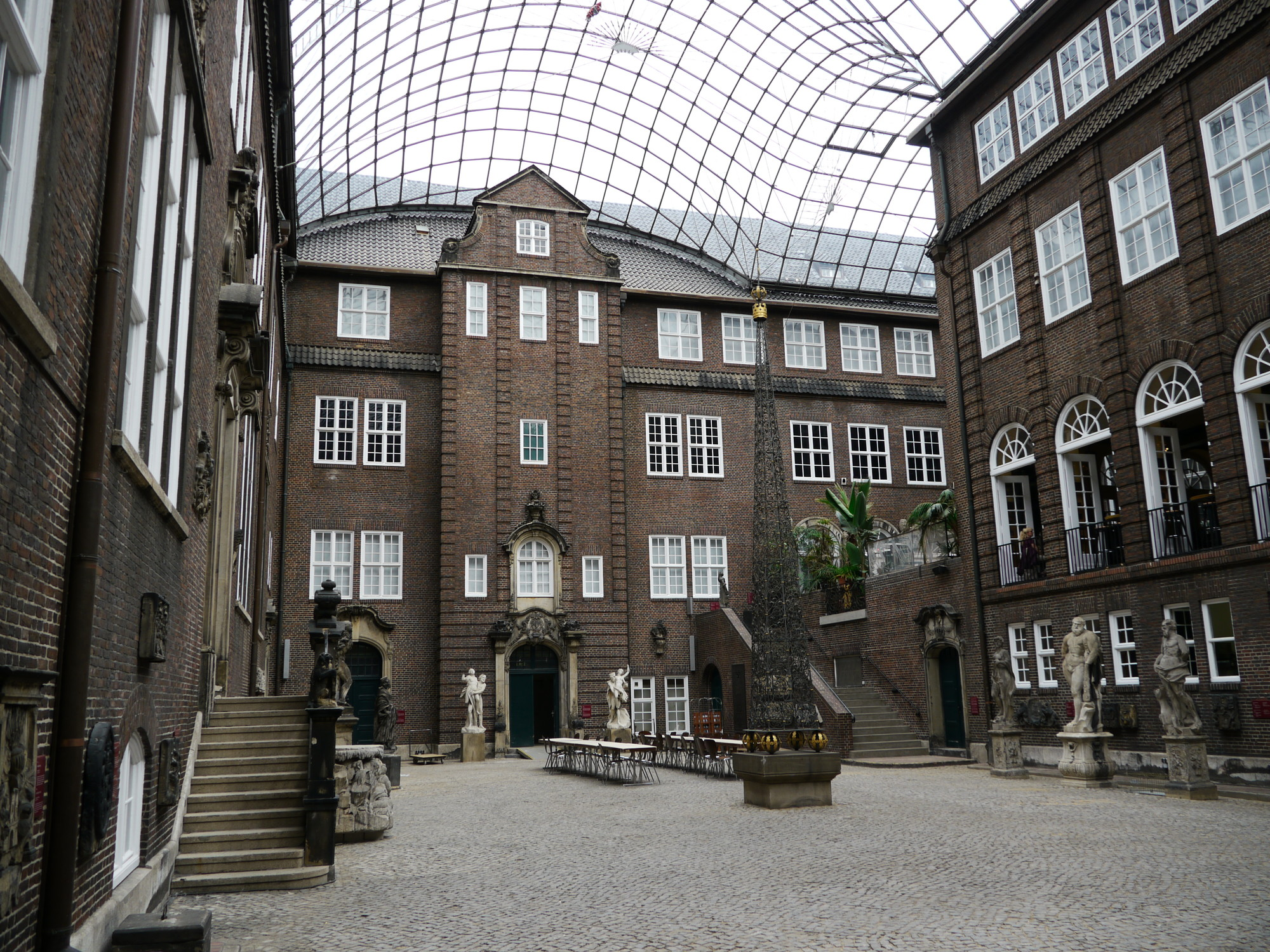
Hamburg Museum's courtyard

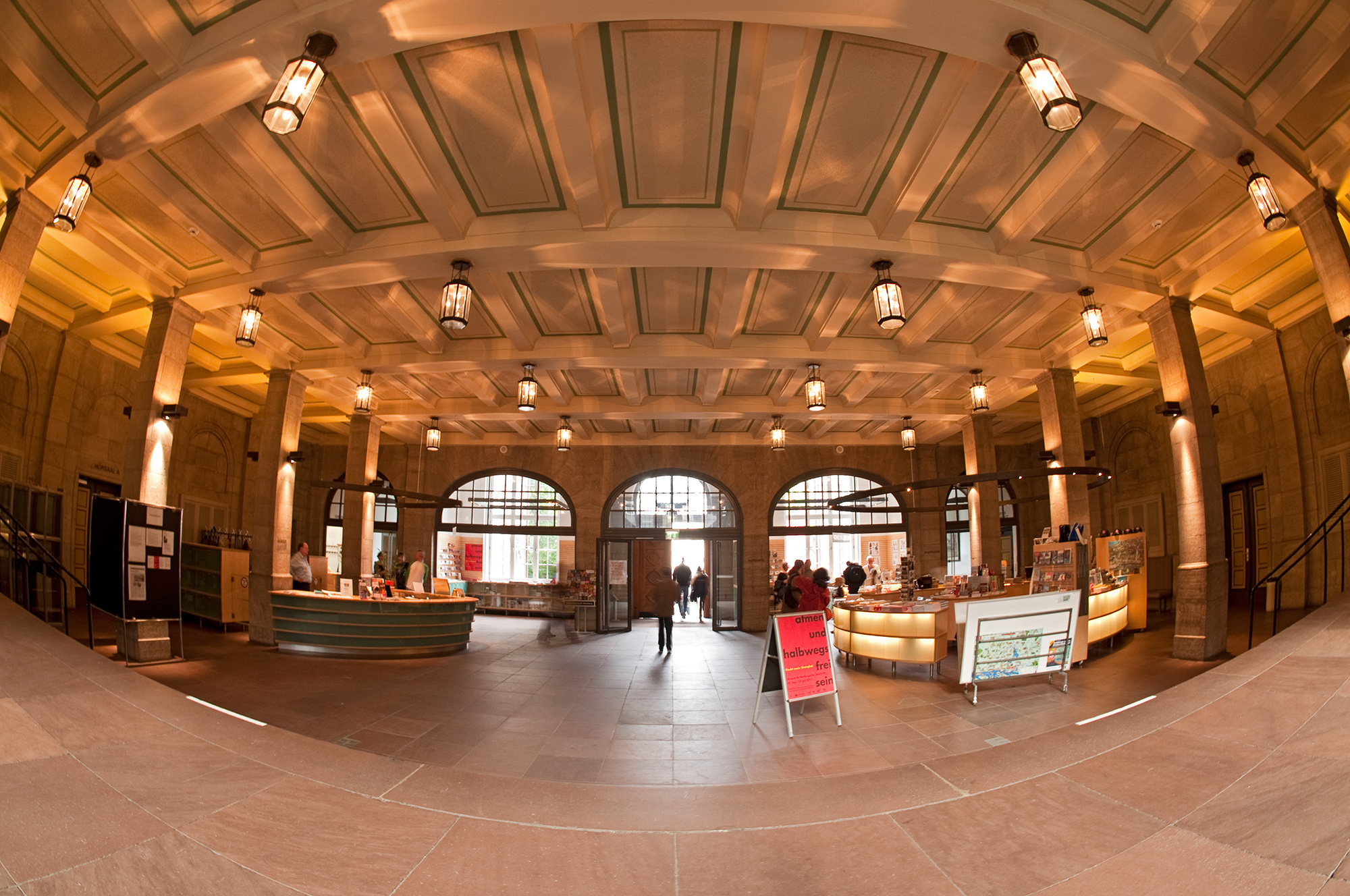
Lobby of the Museum of Hamburg History

The museum has many artifacts preserved by the Society of Hamburg History founded in 1839. The Petri portal from Hamburg's St. Petri Church, built in 1604, was built into the museum courtyard in the 1990s.

The museum is known for having miniature scale models that show the history of the port. It is also a site for the club MEHEV, and the museum has one of the largest scale model railroads.

=== Permanent exhibitions ===
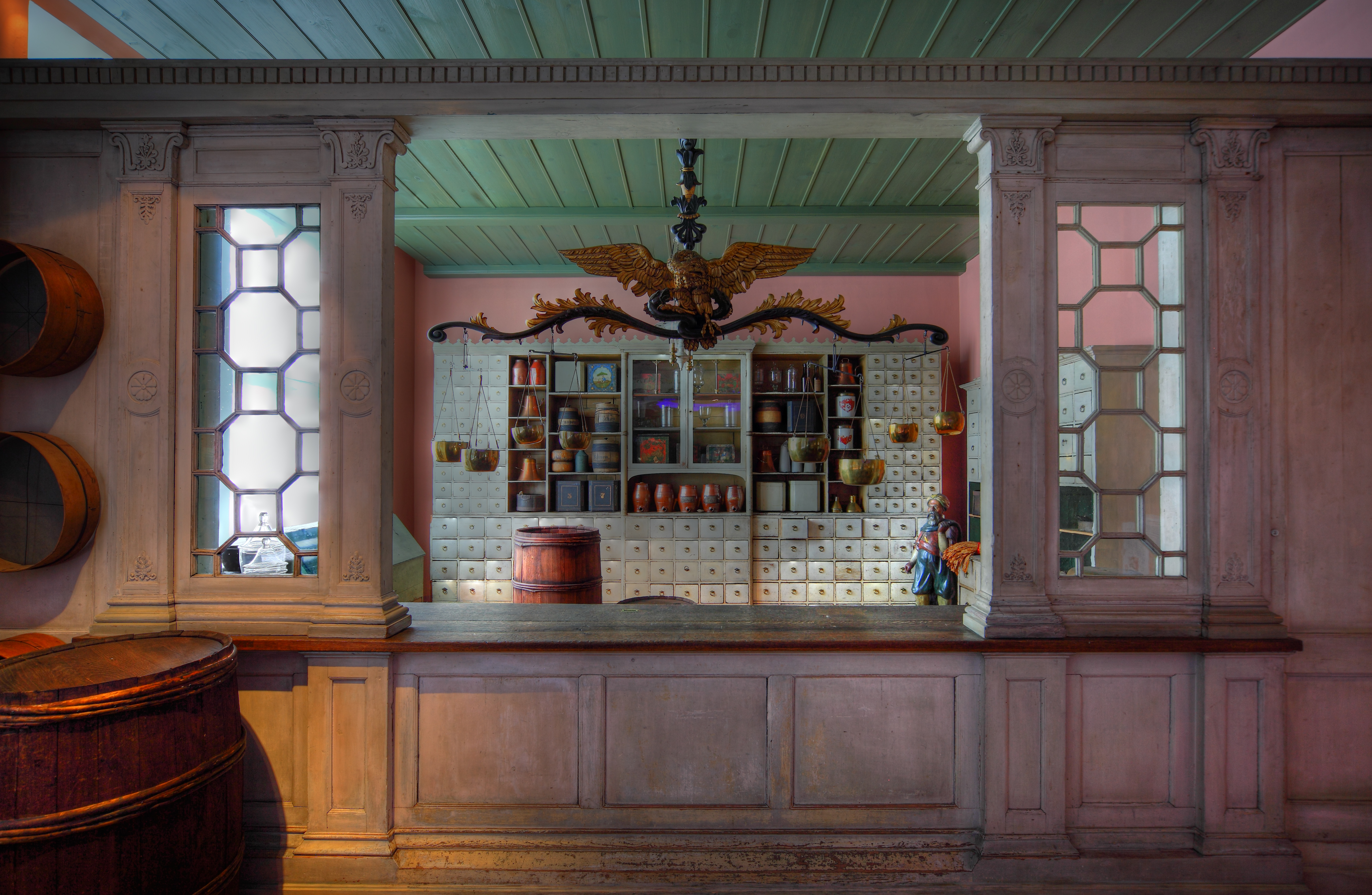
"Colonial Goods Shop" exhibition room, c. 1830

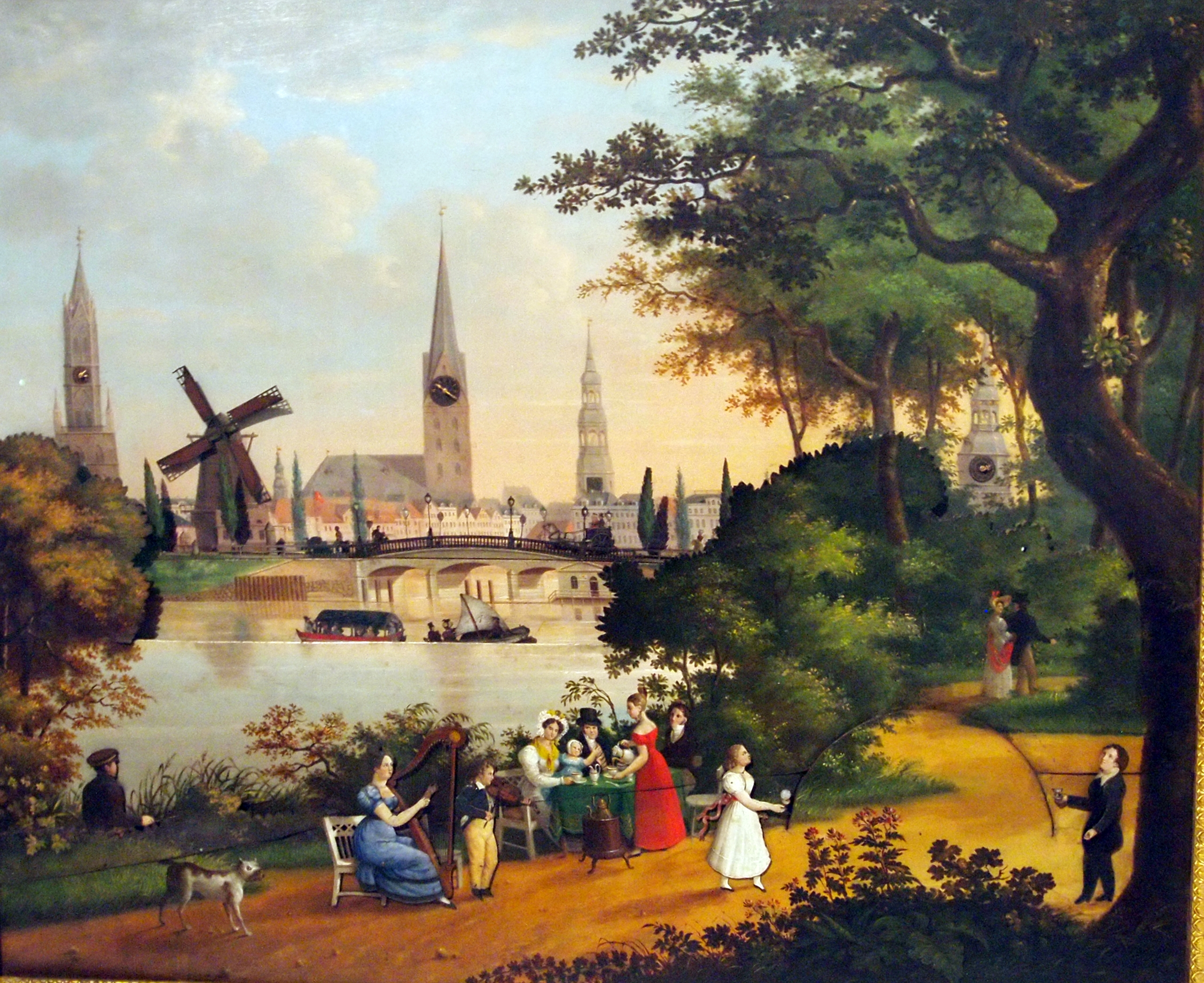
The picture clock with Alster panorama (c. 1830), one of the treasures of the collection

The museum's website lists its permanent exhibitions as:

- Hamburg in the 20th Century
- Hamburg's Historical Highlights
- Medieval Hamburg
- Hamburg and the Church
- Hamburg in the Early Modern Age
- Baroque Merchant Hall
- Cityscape and Constitution in the 17th Century
- The Dawning of the Modern Age
- The 1842 Fire
- Emigration via Hamburg
- Maritime Trade
- Hamburg in the 21st Century
- Navigation Bridge of the Werner Steamship
- The Arrival of the First Jews in Hamburg
- Enlightenment and Emancipation
- During the German Empire
- The Weimar Republic
- Persecution and the Holocaust under the National Socialist Regime
- Jewish Schools
- Jews and Business in Hamburg
- Jewish Residential Areas and Living Conditions
- The Synagogue

== Visitors ==
The museum takes part in the Long Night of Museums (Die lange Nacht der Museen) of Hamburg. This is a spring evening in which museums stay open past midnight, and has been held annually since the year 2000.

== Notable people ==
- Vera Hatz – numismatist

== See also ==
- List of museums and cultural institutions in Hamburg
