= 2026 Hamburg Olympics referendum =

- 31 May 2026
- I am in favour of the German Olympic Sports Confederation applying, with the Free and Hanseatic City of Hamburg as the host city, to stage the Olympic and Paralympic Games for the years 2036, 2040 or 2044. (Note: German: Ich bin dafür, dass sich der Deutsche Olympische Sportbund mit der Freien und Hansestadt Hamburg als Austragungsort um die Ausrichtung der Olympischen und Paralympischen Spiele für die Jahre 2036, 2040 oder 2044 bewirbt.)
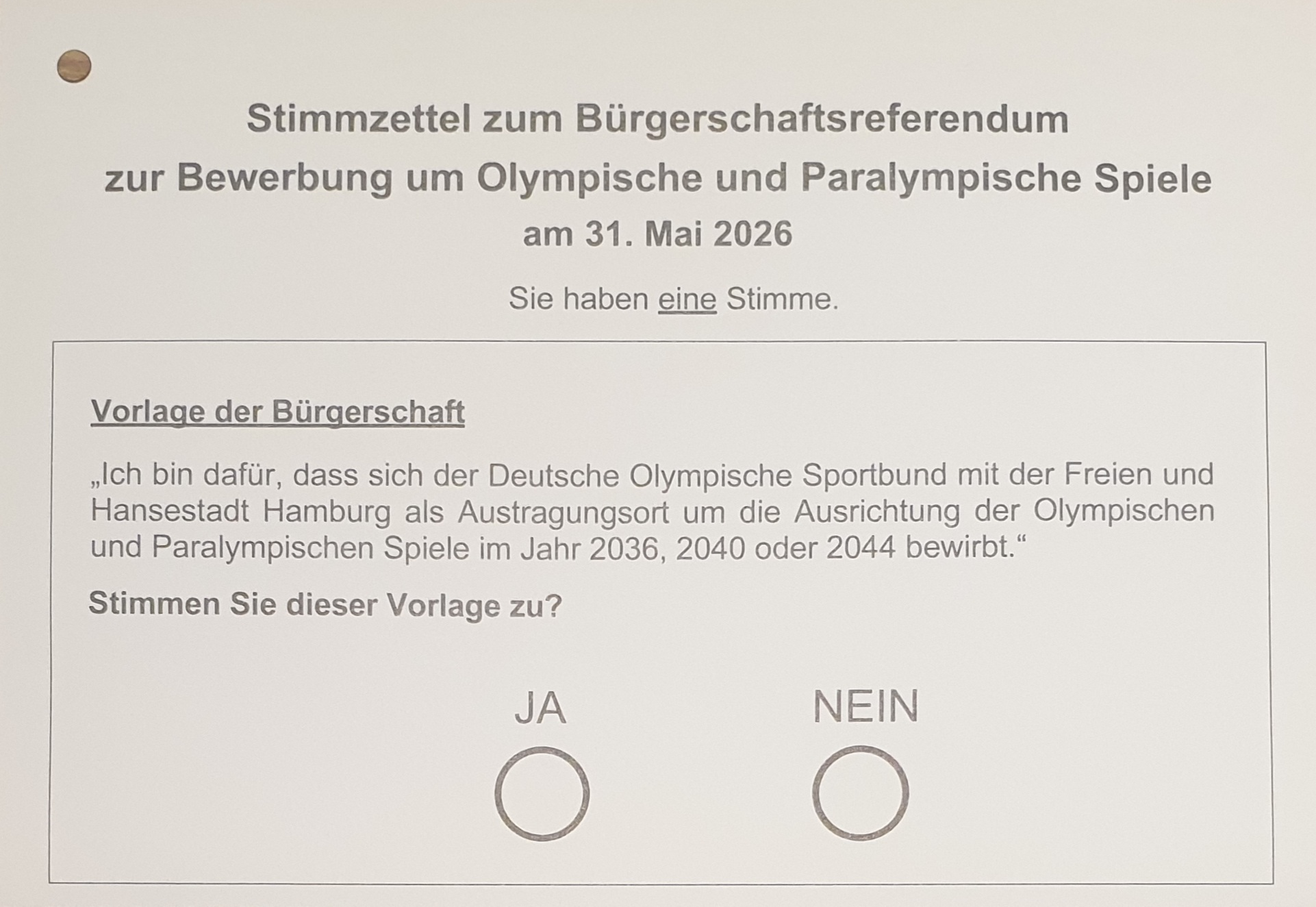
- The ballot for the referendum

Results
Choice	Votes	%
Yes	292,705	44.92%
No	358,861	55.08%
Valid votes	651,566	99.87%
Invalid or blank votes	849	0.13%
Total votes	652,415	100.00%
Registered voters/turnout	1,315,800	49.58%
- Results by county

The 2026 Hamburg Olympic referendum was a citywide referendum held on 31 May 2026 in the Free and Hanseatic City of Hamburg. Voters were asked whether the German Olympic Sports Confederation (DOSB), should apply with Hamburg as the host city for the Olympic and Paralympic Games in 2036, 2040 or 2044. The referendum was the second time in just over a decade that Hamburg residents were asked to decide on an Olympic bid. In 2015, the city had already rejected a bid for the 2024 Summer Olympics, when 51.7 percent of participating voters opposed continuing the candidacy.

The 2026 referendum again resulted in a rejection. The final results confirm that 55.1 percent voted No, while 44.9 percent voted Yes, with a voter turnout of 49.6 percent. Turnout was reported at about 49.6 percent. The result ended Hamburg's participation in the German national selection process before the DOSB's planned decision on which German city or region should be put forward internationally.

== Background ==
The Hamburg vote took place in the context of a broader attempt by Germany to return to the Olympic stage as a Summer Games host. Germany had last hosted the Summer Olympics in Munich in 1972, and several German cities and regions sought to position themselves for a future bid under the more flexible and sustainability-oriented bidding framework promoted by the IOC and the DOSB. Hamburg’s Senate presented its renewed proposal as part of a national race in which Berlin, Munich and the Cologne-Rhine-Ruhr region were also preparing concepts for Games in 2036, 2040 or 2044.

The German Olympic Sports Confederation treated the process as a multi-city national competition. By late 2025, the DOSB had stated that Berlin, Hamburg, Munich and Rhine-Ruhr had completed the first stage of the application process. Hamburg therefore entered the referendum not merely as a city deciding whether to host the Games, but as one of several possible German candidates seeking to persuade the DOSB that it could offer the strongest combination of public support, infrastructure, sports legacy and international appeal.

Public consultation played an important role in Hamburg’s renewed bid. In the run-up to the referendum, the city conducted an “Olympia” preliminary project with online participation and district-level events. In a government statement in May 2026, First Mayor Peter Tschentscher said that more than 800 suggestions had been submitted and that more than 150 had been incorporated into the concept. The Senate argued that, unlike earlier Olympic models, the new approach would rely heavily on existing venues, short distances and long-term urban development projects.

=== Competing German bids ===
In Munich, a citizens’ referendum on the city’s possible bid for the 2036, 2040 or 2044 Olympic and Paralympic Games produced a clear majority in favour. The official final result published by the City of Munich recorded 305,349 Yes votes, or 66.4 percent, against 154,359 No votes, or 33.6 percent. The Cologne-Rhine-Ruhr bid, involving multiple municipalities in North Rhine-Westphalia, also reported broad support. The official campaign site stated that about 66 percent of voters across the participating municipalities supported the bid, with roughly 1.4 million votes cast. The Rhine-Ruhr concept was presented as a regional model rather than a single-city bid, using existing sports infrastructure across a dense metropolitan area.

Berlin followed a different path. Unlike Hamburg, Munich and the Rhine-Ruhr municipalities, Berlin did not hold a referendum before moving forward. The Berlin House of Representatives approved the city’s Olympic concept on 21 May 2026, with the CDU, SPD, AfD and one Left Party member voting in favour, while the Greens and the Left opposed it. Reports noted that Berlin had avoided a referendum partly because of constitutional concerns, leaving parliamentary approval as the central political mandate for the bid.

Hamburg’s partner city Kiel, which had been intended as a sailing venue in the Hamburg concept, voted separately on Olympic participation. Kiel approved involvement in a possible Olympic bid on 19 April 2026, with reports giving support at 63.5 percent. Hamburg’s rejection therefore had consequences beyond the city itself, since it weakened or ended the Hamburg-Kiel bid combination while leaving other potential sailing locations, such as Rostock-Warnemünde in the Berlin concept, in contention.

== Voting ==
=== Legal framework and referendum question ===
The referendum was formally a Bürgerschaftsreferendum, an instrument under Hamburg’s constitution by which the Hamburg Parliament can submit a matter of fundamental citywide importance to a binding popular vote. The official notice stated that such a referendum binds both the Parliament and the Senate. The Hamburg Parliament had approved the referendum on 14 January 2026 following a proposal by the Senate.

The official question on the ballot was: “I am in favour of the German Olympic Sports Confederation applying with the Free and Hanseatic City of Hamburg as the host city for the Olympic and Paralympic Games in 2036, 2040 or 2044. Do you approve this proposal?”

Voters could mark either Yes or No, and each eligible voter had one vote. The official notice set the referendum date for Sunday, 31 May 2026, with polling stations open from 8:00 to 18:00.

=== Eligibility and voting procedure ===
Eligibility was based on the rules for Hamburg parliamentary elections. Eligible voters were German citizens who, on referendum day, had reached the age of 16, had lived or ordinarily resided in Hamburg for at least three months, and were not excluded from voting under Hamburg election law. This meant that many residents of Hamburg without German citizenship, including EU citizens and long-term non-German residents, were not entitled to vote.

The voting documents were sent by post to eligible voters registered in the electoral roll. The official package included a voting notification, an information booklet with statements on the referendum subject, a postal voting certificate, a white ballot for postal voting, a white ballot envelope, a red return envelope and instructions for postal voting. The official notice stated that these documents were to arrive by 10 May 2026. Voters who had not received them by that date were advised to contact a district voting office.

Postal voting played an important role. Voters could mark the white postal ballot, place it in the white envelope, sign the voting certificate, and return both documents in the red postal voting envelope. Postal votes had to reach the relevant district voting authority by 18:00 on 31 May 2026. The official notice also allowed voters to hand in the red envelope at district offices or vote in person at district voting service offices.

The counting process was public. Postal voting envelopes were checked by district voting offices, and the act of voting was recorded in the electronic register. White ballot envelopes were opened in counting centres from 17:00 on referendum day, but the ballots themselves were removed and counted from 18:00 onward. On referendum day, 178 polling stations were open, and voters were allowed to choose freely which polling station to attend.

== Campaign ==
=== For ===
==== Government of Hamburg ====
The Hamburg Senate presented the bid under the slogan “Olympia in Hamburg. Eine Chance für alle” — “Olympics in Hamburg. A chance for all.” The campaign argued that the Games could serve as a catalyst for sport, inclusion, infrastructure, urban development, economic momentum and international visibility.

First Mayor Peter Tschentscher framed the Games as an opportunity for sport, inclusion, social cohesion and Hamburg’s international identity. In his government statement of 6 May 2026, he argued that the Olympic movement had changed since 2015, moving toward greater sustainability, inclusion and use of existing infrastructure. He stated that Hamburg’s concept was based on short distances, existing venues and long-term city projects, including housing in Science City Bahrenfeld, public transport improvements, sports infrastructure and green spaces.

The Senate’s concept emphasized what it called “Games of short distances.” According to Tschentscher, 85 percent of Hamburg’s competition venues would lie within a radius of seven kilometres, and the city would avoid building venues used only for the Games. The Olympic Village was to be integrated into Science City Bahrenfeld, with around 4,000 apartments later becoming housing for Hamburg residents, more than half of them subsidized.

Sports Senator Andy Grote argued that Hamburg could become “the most beautiful arena in the world” and that the Games would support innovation, economic dynamism and sports development. Second Mayor Katharina Fegebank supported the bid as a project of optimism and urban transformation, arguing that Hamburg’s compact geography and sporting enthusiasm made it a strong candidate.

==== Campaign launch, drone shows and prominent supporters ====
The official campaign began with a highly visible public event on 26 February 2026, when 900 drones flew over the Elbphilharmonie and Hamburg harbour. The drones rose up to 120 metres, forming Olympic and Paralympic sports images, including fencing, rowing, weightlifting, para-dressage and para-athletics, before displaying the campaign slogan. Individual drone motifs were reported to span around 200 metres.

Further drone displays were reported during the campaign period, including a show connected with the 837th Hamburg Port Anniversary in May 2026. Contemporary reports described the drone light show at the harbour as a visual sign supporting Hamburg’s Olympic bid. Some campaign criticism referred more generally to repeated “drone shows” as part of the pro-Olympic public-relations effort; however, the most clearly documented shows in the sources reviewed here are the February campaign launch and the May Port Anniversary display.

The pro-Olympic campaign involved numerous figures from sport and public life. The launch event was accompanied by Edina Müller, Paralympic champion and German flag bearer at Paris 2024; Horst Hrubesch, HSV legend and Olympic medal-winning football coach; and Laura Ludwig, Olympic beach volleyball champion. The Senate also named Eva Lys, Patrick Esume, Johannes B. Kerner, Alexander Zverev, Christina Rann and Imke Salander as prominent supporters intended to help persuade Hamburg residents to vote Yes.

The campaign was not limited to celebrities. The Senate said it would use up to 50 campaign motifs across posters and city information displays, combined with district-level events and social-media communication. Themes included sustainability, community experience, future investment and Olympic and Paralympic values.

==== Business support and campaign financing ====
Hamburg’s business community also supported the bid. The Hamburg Chamber of Commerce described the Olympic and Paralympic Games as a catalyst for mobility, sustainable urban development, infrastructure, business, culture and social cohesion. It stated that 26 chambers and associations had signed a joint declaration in favour of Summer Games in Hamburg.

The Chamber of Commerce page also stated that the HKS Handelskammer Hamburg Service GmbH supported the campaign of the Free and Hanseatic City of Hamburg for the Olympic and Paralympic Games, thanking companies that made this support possible through sponsorship.

The exact final cost of the public campaign depends on how one distinguishes the Senate’s communication budget, external sponsorship, public events and campaign-related advertising. Opposition sources and critical reporting referred to a €2 million Senate communication or advertising budget. A statement by the Left parliamentary group said that, by 15 April 2026, the Senate had already paid almost €500,000 for advertising and that a total of €2 million was available for the communication concept. The same source said that the Chamber of Commerce was administering a fund into which supporters had paid €1.3 million by 5 May 2026, and that the first 900-drone show had cost €86,000. These figures should be presented as campaign-finance figures reported by opponents and linked to parliamentary inquiry / transparency-disclosure references, rather than as a final audited total unless confirmed by official financial accounts.

Separate from campaign spending, the Senate’s financial concept for hosting the Games estimated €4.8 billion in organisational and operating costs, which it said would be covered by event revenues of about €4.9 billion. The city also projected an investment budget of around €1.3 billion for long-term infrastructure and urban development. Critics disputed the assumptions and argued that cost overruns and indirect public costs were likely.

=== Against ===
==== The NOlympia campaign ====
Opposition to the bid was led in civil society by the NOlympia Hamburg alliance. The group described itself as a broad coalition of people from different walks of life united by the belief that Olympic and Paralympic Games would create more problems than opportunities for Hamburg. It explicitly linked the 2026 campaign to the city’s 2015 rejection of the 2024 bid and argued that the Senate was ignoring an earlier democratic decision.

NOlympia’s central arguments concerned public cost, budget risk, housing pressure, social priorities, traffic, environmental impact and the political opportunity cost of focusing administrative and financial resources on a mega-event. The group argued that money spent on Olympic preparations would be missing from education, mobility, housing and social services. It also challenged the Senate’s optimistic cost and legacy claims, citing the history of Olympic cost overruns and warning that a city-state such as Hamburg would bear unacceptable financial risk.

A major procedural issue was the inclusion of a critical statement in the official referendum booklet. NOlympia had to collect 10,000 valid signatures for its counter-statement to be included. The initiative stated that it submitted 19,423 signatures, well above the threshold. The Left Party’s Hamburg page also referred to the signature effort and described the referendum as a directional choice between a costly mega-event and public priorities such as affordable housing, education, social security, culture, climate protection and functional mobility.

== Results ==
Majority results by district

The referendum produced a clear majority against the bid. The provisional official result published by the Hamburg Parliament gave 55.1 percent No and 44.9 percent Yes, with a turnout of 49.6 percent. The Parliament described the result as clear, and Parliament President Carola Veit stated that Hamburg should not apply and that there was “nothing to relitigate” about the outcome.

The outcome resembled, but was more decisive than, Hamburg’s 2015 Olympic referendum. In 2015, Hamburg’s bid for the 2024 Games was defeated by a narrow majority of just over 51 percent. In 2026, the No side won by a wider margin, despite a much more developed official campaign, a stronger emphasis on existing infrastructure and a national context in which several other German candidates had secured or were seeking political support.

Choice	Votes	%
For	292,705	44.92
Against	358,861	55.08
Total	651,566	100.00
Valid votes	651,566	99.87
Invalid/blank votes	849	0.13
Total votes	652,415	100.00
Registered voters/turnout	1,315,800	49.58
Source: Statistics Office

=== Results by borough ===
Borough	Yes		No		Formal		Informal		Turnout		Enrolment
Borough	Votes	%	Votes	%	Votes	%	Votes	%	Votes	%	Enrolment
Altona	44,647	42.8%	59,675	57.2%	104,322	99.9%	122	0.1%	104,444	54.4%	192,154
Bergedorf	18,288	45.1%	22,262	54.9%	40,550	99.8%	63	0.2%	40,613	44.6%	91,121
Eimsbüttel	49,936	46.3%	57,888	53.7%	107,824	99.9%	139	0.1%	107,963	54.9%	196,625
Hamburg-Mitte	28,220	38.3%	45,389	61.7%	73,609	99.9%	106	0.1%	73,715	40.5%	182,019
Hamburg-Nord	60,430	47.3%	67,219	52.7%	127,649	99.9%	154	0.1%	127,803	53.7%	237,902
Harburg	17,596	41.4%	24,905	58.6%	42,501	99.8%	82	0.2%	42,583	41.2%	103,329
Wandsbek	73,588	47.4%	81,523	52.6%	155,111	99.9%	183	0.1%	155,294	49.7%	312,650
Total	292,705	44.9%	358,861	55.1%	651,566	99.9%	849	0.1%	625,415	49.6%	1,315,800

=== Results by quarter ===
Quarter	Borough	Yes		No		Formal		Informal		Turnout		Enrolment
Quarter	Borough	Votes	%	Votes	%	Votes	%	Votes	%	Votes	%	Enrolment
Altona-Altstadt	Altona	2,935	28.6%	7,312	71.4%	10,247	99.8%	17	0.2%	10,264	51.8%	19,813
Altona-Nord	Altona	3,045	31.4%	6,645	68.6%	9,690	99.9%	10	0.1%	9,700	54.7%	17,738
Alsterdorf	Hamburg-Nord	3,364	49.9%	3,383	50.1%	6,747	99.8%	13	0.2%	6,760	58.4%	11,577
Bahrenfeld	Altona	3,815	35.3%	6,994	64.7%	10,809	99.8%	24	0.2%	10,833	53.8%	20,120
Barmbek-Nord	Hamburg-Nord	6,368	39.0%	9,970	61.0%	16,338	99.8%	25	0.2%	16,363	50.5%	32,431
Barmbek-Süd	Hamburg-Nord	6,243	43.6%	8,085	56.4%	14,328	99.9%	11	0.1%	14,339	52.7%	27,208
Billbrook/Rothenburgsort	Hamburg-Mitte	651	34.9%	1,215	65.1%	1,866	99.9%	2	0.1%	1,868	30.7%	6,094
Billstedt	Hamburg-Mitte	5,096	42.6%	6,855	57.4%	11,951	99.8%	23	0.2%	11,974	29.2%	41,026
Blankenese	Altona	3,966	58.9%	2,773	41.1%	6,739	99.9%	3	0.3%	6,742	65.0%	10,378
Borgfelde	Hamburg-Mitte	854	39.1%	1,329	60.9%	2,183	99.8%	4	0.2%	2,187	45.7%	4,782
Dulsberg	Hamburg-Nord	1,678	37.8%	2,760	62.2%	4,438	99.9%	5	0.1%	4,443	38.9%	11,430
Eidelstedt	Eimsbüttel	4,557	43.7%	5,880	56.3%	10,437	99.9%	13	0.1%	10,450	44.7%	23,364
Eimsbüttel	Eimsbüttel	10,314	39.6%	15,744	60.4%	26,058	99.9%	33	0.1%	26,091	59.1%	44,171
Eppendorf	Hamburg-Nord	6,347	55.3%	5,125	44.7%	11,472	99.9%	10	0.1%	11,482	59.0%	19,467
Fuhlsbüttel	Hamburg-Nord	2,383	45.3%	2,876	54.7%	5,259	99.9%	7	0.1%	5,266	55.8%	9,443
Groß Borstel	Hamburg-Nord	2,023	50.2%	2,010	49.8%	4,033	99.9%	3	0.1%	4,036	55.8%	7,235
Groß Flottbek	Altona	2,931	56.2%	2,288	43.8%	5,219	99.9%	6	0.1%	5,225	66.4%	7,870
HafenCity	Hamburg-Mitte	2,270	62.2%	1,378	37.8%	3,648	99.9%	4	0.1%	3,652	57.6%	6,336
Hamm	Hamburg-Mitte	4,802	37.1%	8,125	62.9%	12,927	99.9%	13	0.1%	12,940	48.2%	26,874
Hamburg-Altstadt/Neuwerk	Hamburg-Mitte	454	50.9%	438	49.1%	892	99.9%	1	0.1%	893	51.4%	1,738
Hammerbrook	Hamburg-Mitte	640	46.7%	730	53.3%	1,370	99.8%	3	0.2%	1,373	42.6%	3,221
Harvestehude	Eimsbüttel	4,643	58.2%	3,334	41.8%	7,977	99.8%	12	0.2%	7,989	60.5%	13,212
Hoheluft-Ost	Hamburg-Nord	2,330	52.3%	2,129	47.7%	4,459	99.8%	9	0.2%	4,468	58.3%	7,662
Hoheluft-West	Eimsbüttel	2,782	45.2%	3,373	54.8%	6,155	99.9%	7	0.1%	6,162	58.9%	10,456
Hohenfelde	Hamburg-Nord	1,808	49.5%	1,841	50.5%	3,649	99.8%	6	0.2%	3,655	52.5%	6,962
Horn	Hamburg-Mitte	2,833	38.6%	4,502	61.4%	7,335	99.8%	12	0.2%	7,347	32.9%	22,337
Iserbrook	Altona	2,213	47.6%	2,440	52.4%	4,653	99.9%	5	0.1%	4,658	55.5%	8,392
Langenhorn	Hamburg-Nord	6,942	46.2%	8,071	53.8%	15,013	99.8%	29	0.2%	15,042	46.6%	32,277
Lokstedt	Eimsbüttel	5,962	48.7%	6,270	51.3%	12,232	99.9%	15	0.1%	12,247	55.8%	21,929
Lurup	Altona	3,569	43.2%	4,684	56.8%	8,253	99.9%	9	0.1%	8,262	36.1%	22,910
Neustadt	Hamburg-Mitte	1,887	39.0%	2,951	61.0%	4,838	99.8%	10	0.2%	4,848	54.7%	8,860
Niendorf	Eimsbüttel	8,403	48.3%	9,008	51.7%	17,411	99.8%	27	0.2%	17,438	56.4%	30,909
Nienstedten	Altona	2,051	61.4%	1,292	38.6%	3,343	99.9%	5	0.1%	3,348	63.4%	5,283
Ohlsdorf	Hamburg-Nord	3,104	44.0%	3,955	56.0%	7,059	99.9%	6	0.1%	7,065	56.6%	12,485
Osdorf	Altona	3,842	48.6%	4,069	51.4%	7,911	99.9%	8	0.1%	7,919	45.9%	17,271
Othmarschen	Altona	4,091	56.2%	3,190	43.8%	7,281	99.9%	8	0.1%	7,289	64.0%	11,381
Ottensen	Altona	5,606	34.6%	10,599	65.4%	16,205	99.9%	16	0.1%	16,221	59.8%	27,125
Rissen	Altona	3,935	53.9%	3,369	46.1%	7,304	99.9%	8	0.1%	7,312	61.2%	11,941
Rotherbaum	Eimsbüttel	4,026	54.1%	3,422	45.9%	7,448	99.9%	10	0.1%	7,458	59.9%	12,457
St. Georg	Hamburg-Mitte	1,940	45.2%	2,351	54.8%	4,291	99.9%	4	0.1%	4,295	55.8%	7,699
St. Pauli	Hamburg-Mitte	1,848	23.7%	5,937	76.3%	7,785	99.9%	8	0.1%	7,793	52.5%	14,832
Schnelsen	Eimsbüttel	5,169	49.3%	5,324	50.7%	10,493	99.9%	11	0.1%	10,504	50.1%	20,978
Stellingen	Eimsbüttel	4,080	42.4%	5,533	57.6%	9,613	99.9%	11	0.1%	9,624	50.3%	19,149
Sternschanze	Altona	762	25.9%	2,178	74.1%	2,940	100.0%	0	0.0%	2,940	54.5%	5,392
Sülldorf	Altona	1,886	50.6%	1,842	49.4%	3,728	99.9%	3	0.1%	3,731	57.0%	6,540
Uhlenhorst	Hamburg-Nord	4,884	55.3%	3,953	44.7%	8,837	99.9%	4	0.1%	8,841	60.2%	14,688
Veddel/Kleiner Grasbrook/Steinwerder	Hamburg-Mitte	214	22.3%	746	77.7%	960	99.9%	1	0.1%	961	36.4%	2,641
Waltershof/Finkenwerder	Hamburg-Mitte	1,493	38.4%	2,400	61.6%	3,893	99.8%	9	0.2%	3,902	52.5%	7,433
Wilhelmsburg	Hamburg-Mitte	3,238	33.5%	6,432	66.5%	9,670	99.9%	12	0.1%	9,682	34.4%	28,146
Winterhude	Hamburg-Nord	12,956	49.8%	13,061	50.2%	26,017	99.9%	26	0.1%	26,043	57.8%	45,037
Total		292,705	44.9%	358,861	55.1%	651,566	99.9%	849	0.1%	625,415	49.6%	1,315,800

== Aftermath ==
The consequences were immediate. On the evening of the vote, First Mayor Peter Tschentscher announced that the result was binding on the Senate and that he had informed DOSB president Thomas Weikert and Germany’s IOC representative Michael Mronz that Hamburg was withdrawing its bid. Tschentscher expressed regret, thanked supporters, and said the city would continue pursuing its urban development and infrastructure goals without the Olympic framework.

Second Mayor Katharina Fegebank said the result was a "missed chance" but stated that the Senate would respect the decision and support another German city or region if selected by the DOSB. She also argued that the fears of higher costs, rising rents and excessive construction disruption had not been overcome during the campaign, even though the Senate believed those concerns were unfounded.

Sports Senator Andy Grote thanked the many volunteers, athletes and supporters who had campaigned for the bid. He noted that more than 250,000 Hamburg voters had supported the idea, but said the majority decision had to be accepted. Grote added that the Senate wanted to preserve some of the positive energy from the campaign by pursuing parts of the concept, especially projects promoting physical activity among children and young people.

For the DOSB, Hamburg's withdrawal reduced the national field to Berlin, Munich and Rhine-Ruhr. Reports before and after the referendum stated that the DOSB planned to decide on 26 September 2026 which German candidate would move forward internationally. Hamburg's rejection also created uncertainty for Kiel as a sailing partner, even though Kiel itself had voted in favour of participation.
