= Borgfelde =

- Quarter of Hamburg
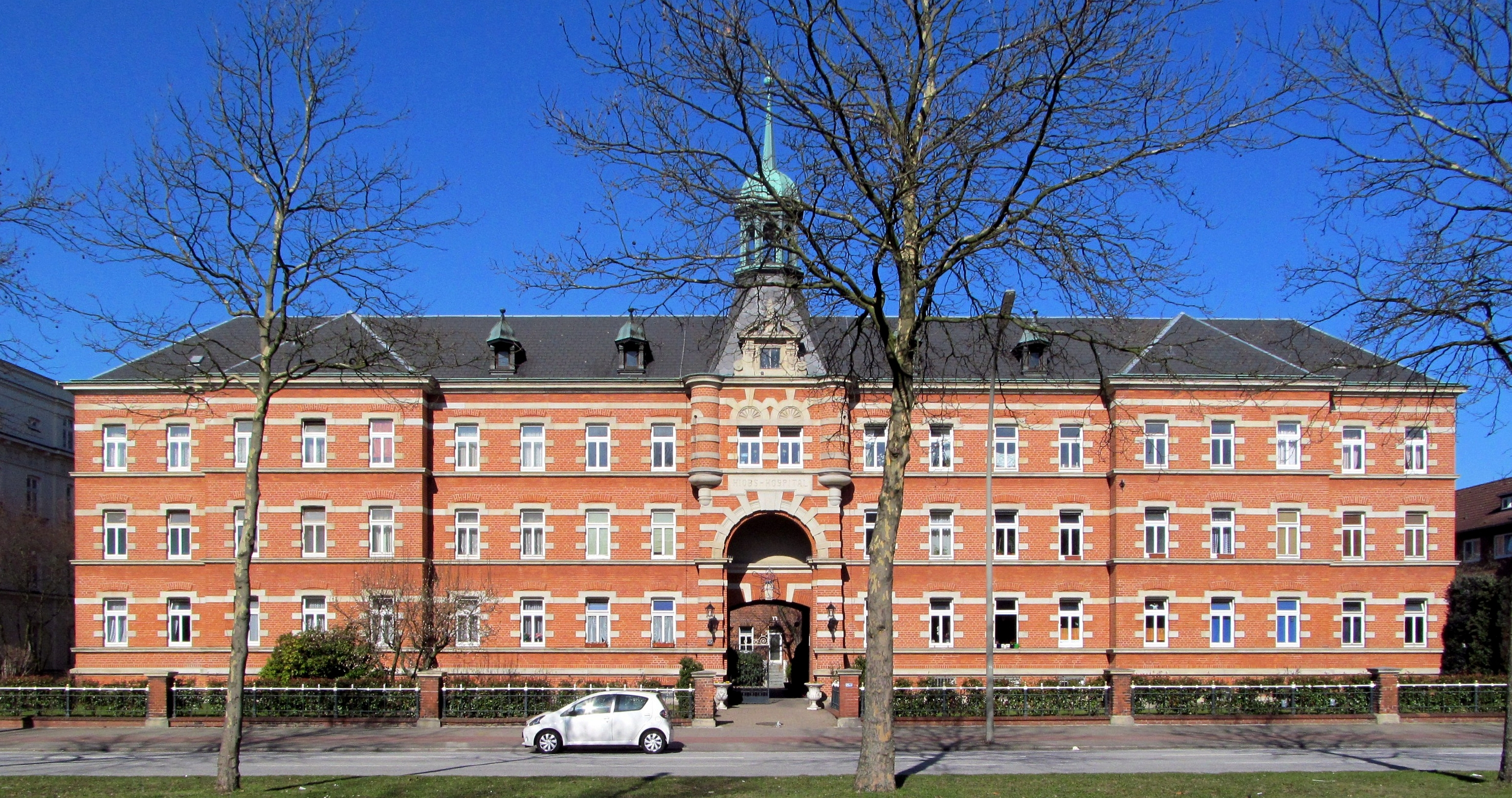
- Hospital of St. Hiob at the street of Bürgerweide

- Location of Bordfelde in Hamburg
- Interactive map of Borgfelde
- Location within Germany Location within Hamburg
- Coordinates: 53.55475°N 10.03447°E
- Country: Germany
- State: Hamburg
- City: Hamburg
- Borough: Hamburg-Mitte

Area
  - Total: 0.9 km^{2} (0.35 sq mi)

Population (2024-12-31)
  - Total: 8,880
  - Density: 9,900/km^{2} (26,000/sq mi)
- Time zone: UTC+01:00 (CET)
  - Summer (DST): UTC+02:00 (CEST)
- Dialling codes: 040
- Vehicle registration: HH

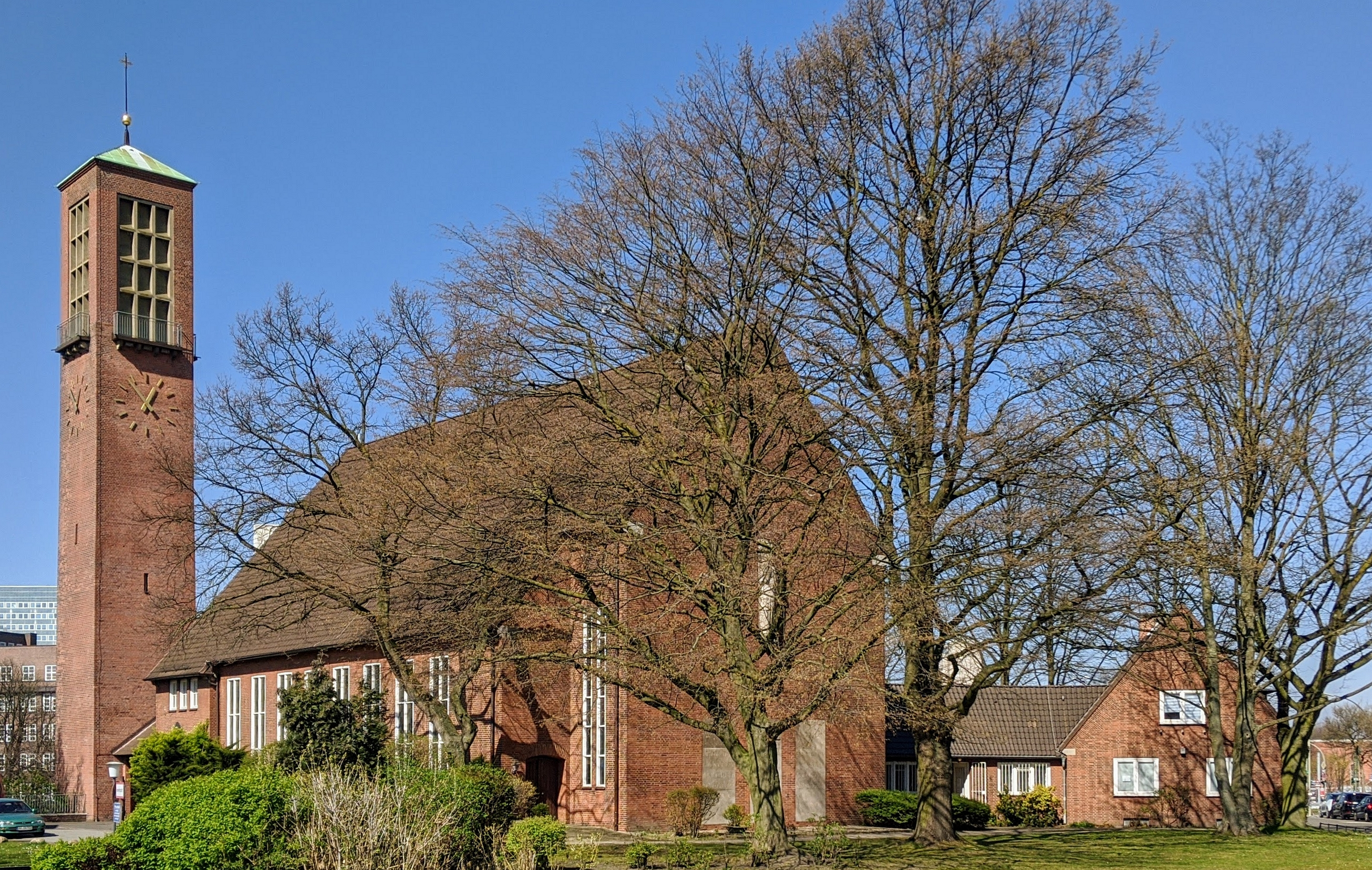
Redeemer's Church in Borgfelde

Borgfelde (German pronunciation: [bɔʁkˈfɛldə]) is a quarter of Hamburg, Germany, in the borough of Hamburg-Mitte. It is located on the northern border of the borough adjacent to the borough of Hamburg-Nord. It is a more densely populated area, approximately 2 km from Hamburg city centre. With a size of around 0.9 square kilometers it is one of the smallest quarters of Hamburg.

== Name ==
The name Borgfelde refers to fields of pastureland belonging to the citizens (Bürger, Low German Borger or Börger). The name of the street Bürgerweide, which leads through the quarter, has the same origin.

== Geography ==
Borgfelde borders the quarters of Hohenfelde, Hamm, Hammerbrook, and St. Georg. The southern border is formed by the channel of Mittelkanal. Borgfelde is separated in two parts, called by the inhabitants Oben Borgfelde (Upper Borgfelde) and Unten Borgfelde (Lower Borgfelde), by the former federal road of Bundesstraße 5 as well as by a Geest slope.

== History ==
Borgfelde faced major destruction during the Bombing of Hamburg in World War II. Today it is therefore dominated by brick apartment buildings built or reconstructed in the 1950s and 60s. This applies also to the church of Erlöserkirche (Redeemer's Church). Originally built in 1902 and destroyed by the bombing in 1943, it was re-built with a then modern architecture in 1952.

== Politics ==
These are the results of Borgfelde in the Hamburg state election:

Election	SPD	Greens	Left	CDU	AfD	FDP	Others
2020	34,2 %	28,0 %	11,9 %	7,1 %	5,6 %	3,4 %	9,8 %
2015	44,1 %	14,3 %	10,7 %	12,0 %	6,1 %	5,8 %	7,0 %
2011	47,3 %	14,1 %	6,6 %	17,4 %	–	5,1 %	9,5 %
2008	38,4 %	9,1 %	7,5 %	38,0 %	–	3,0 %	4,0 %
2004	33,5 %	14,1 %	–	42,1 %	–	2,3 %	8,1 %
2001	40,9 %	8,7 %	0,5 %	23,3 %	–	4,7 %	21,9 %
1997	37,2 %	13,4 %	0,9 %	30,0 %	–	2,2 %	16,3 %
1993	43,1 %	12,3 %	–	24,7 %	–	3,1 %	16,8 %
