= USS Eten =

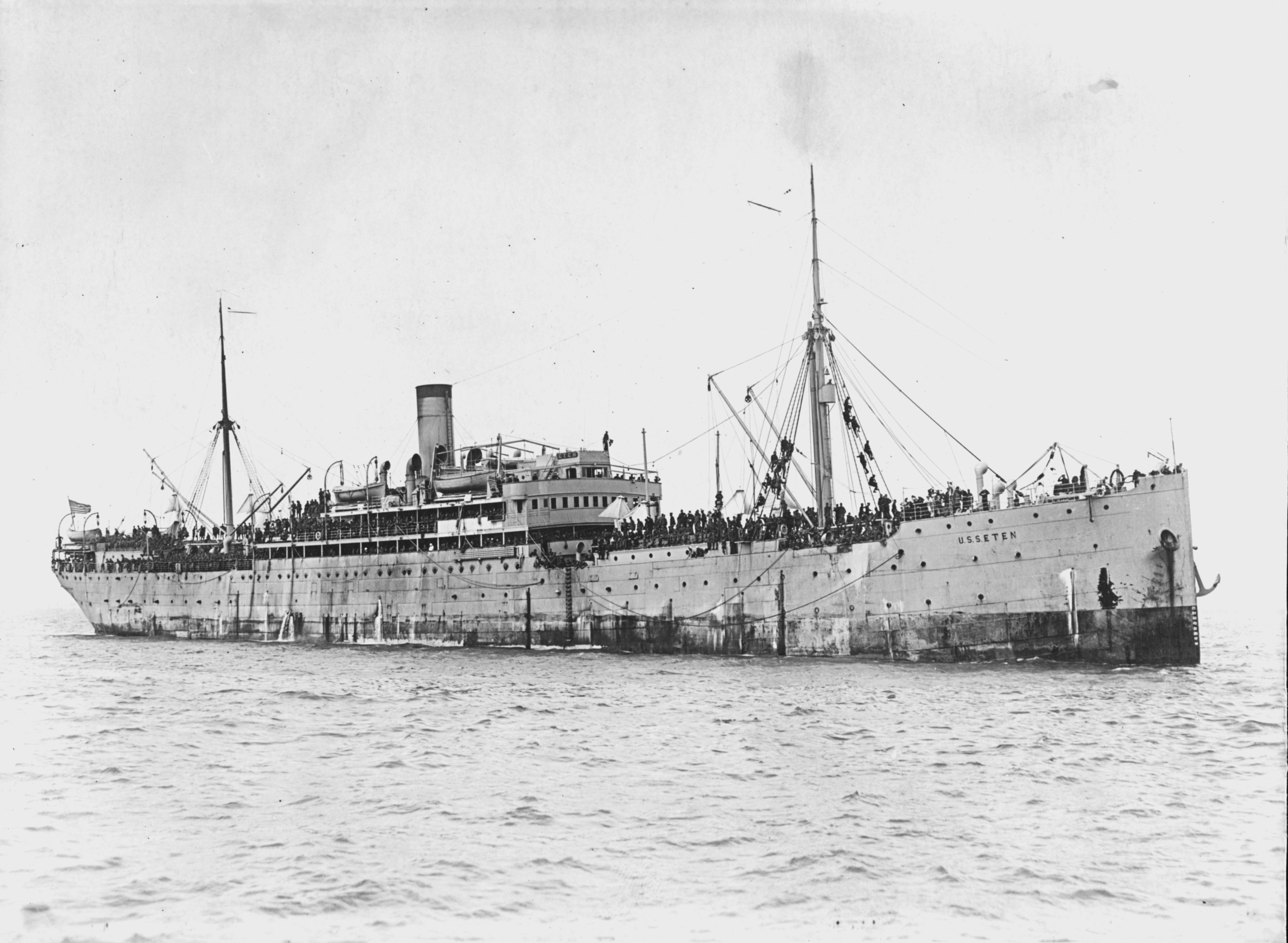
- USS Eten (ID-4041) bringing troops home from France, 1919

History
- Name: USS Eten (ID-4041)
- Namesake: Puerto Eten, Peru
- Owner: Kosmos Line (1907–17); Peruvian Govt. (1917–22); Peruvian Line (1922–34); Peruvian Navy (1934–48); Peruvian Govt. (1948–59)
- Operator: Kosmos Line (1907–17); U.S. Navy (1 May–19 August 1919); United States & Australia Line (Note: Under charter from the USSB.) (1919–21); Peruvian Line (1922–34); Peruvian Navy (1934–48); Peruvian Govt. (1948–50); Peruvian Ministry of Marine (1950–59)
- Port of registry: 1907–17: Hamburg, Germany; 1917–21: United States; 1922–34: Callao, Peru; 1934–48: Peru; 1948–59: Callao, Peru
- Builder: Blohm & Voss (Steinwerder, Germany)
- Yard number: 193
- Launched: 11 February 1907
- Christened: Rhakotis
- Completed: 20 April 1907
- Commissioned: 1 May 1919 (USN)
- Decommissioned: 19 August 1919
- Renamed: Eten (1919); Rimac (1922)
- Refit: —as troop transport: 29 April–28 May 1919; —as passenger-cargo ship: after August 1919
- Fate: Broken up at Sakai, Japan, 20 August 1959

General characteristics
- Type: Passenger-cargo ship (1907–17; 1919–34)
- Tonnage: 6,982 GRT; 4,475 net; 8,500 DW
- Length: 435 ft 7 in (132.8 m)
- Beam: 53 ft 2 in (16.2 m)
- Draft: 23 ft 10 in (7.3 m)
- Depth of hold: 28 ft 2 in (8.6 m)
- Decks: 2
- Installed power: 4 boilers; 3,162 IHP
- Propulsion: 2 x 3-cyl. triple-expansion steam engines; Twin screw
- Speed: 14 kn (16 mph; 26 km/h)
- Range: 11,000 nautical miles

General characteristics
- Type: Troop transport (28 May–19 August 1919)
- Displacement: 12,787 tons
- Capacity: 80 officers, 1,761 enlisted
- Complement: 21 officers, 168 enlisted
- Notes: Other characteristics similar to passenger-cargo details above

USS Eten (ID-4041) was a troop transport commissioned in 1919 to assist in the post-World War I repatriation of U.S. troops from France.

Eten was originally SS Rhakotis, a German passenger-cargo steamer built in 1907 for trade between Germany and South America. After the outbreak of World War I, Rhakotis operated briefly as a clandestine supply ship for German naval forces, before being interned in Peru. In 1918, Rhakotis was seized by the Peruvian government and chartered to the United States Shipping Board, who had her converted into a troop transport. Renamed USS Eten, the ship made two trips to France to repatriate U.S. troops between May and July 1919.

After decommissioning, SS Eten operated briefly in the postwar period as a passenger-cargo ship, running between New York and South Africa, before being returned to her owners, the Peruvian government, in 1922. Renamed SS Rimac, the ship operated with the Peruvian Line until 1934, when she was transferred to the Peruvian Navy. In the 1930s, Rimac played a role in the suppression of two attempted coups against the Peruvian government, the first in 1931 and the second—while in use as a presidential transport—in 1939. Rimac was transferred from the Navy to the Peruvian government in 1948 and to the Peruvian Ministry of Marine in 1950. She was broken up at Sakai, Japan in 1959.

== Construction and design ==
SS Rhakotis—a steel-hulled, twin-screw passenger-cargo steamer—was built by Blohm & Voss at Steinwerder, Germany, in 1907 for the Kosmos Line, a German company which ran a cargo line between Hamburg, Germany, and South America. Rhakotis was launched on 11 February 1907 and completed on 20 April.

Rhakotis had a length of 435 feet 7 inches (132.8 m), a beam of 53 feet 2 inches (16.2 m), draft of 23 feet 10 inches (7.3 m) and hold depth 28 feet 2 inches (8.6 m). She had a gross register tonnage of 6,982, net register tonnage of 4,475, deadweight tonnage of 8,500 and displacement of 12,787 long tons. In addition to her cargo space, Rhakotis was fitted with accommodations for 48 first-, 16 second- and 44 third-class passengers. The ship had two decks, two masts and a single smokestack. (Note: See photos.)

Rhakotis was powered by a pair of three-cylinder vertical triple expansion steam engines with cylinders of 23, 36 and 63 inches (58, 91 and 160 cm) by 42-inch (110 cm) stroke. (Note: See under "Eten". Note that reported cylinder sizes for this ship vary by fractions of an inch depending on source.) Steam was supplied by four coal-fired Scotch boilers. The engines developed a combined ihp of 3,162, giving the ship a service speed of 14 knots (16 mph; 26 km/h).

== Service history ==
=== Early service, 1907–17 ===
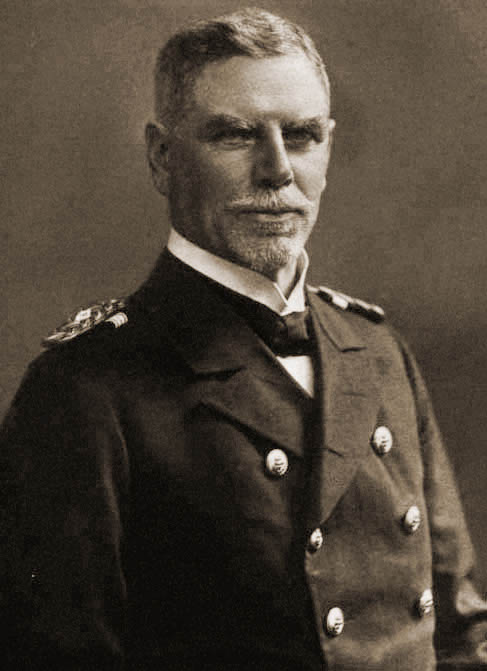
Admiral Maximilian von Spee. Rhakotis violated Chilean neutrality by supplying von Spee's naval squadron in November 1914

Following her completion in April 1907, Rhakotis entered service with the Kosmos Line. Though the precise route of Rhakotis is not known, ships of the Kosmos Line operated between their homeport of Hamburg, Germany and various countries in South America, including Peru, Chile, Ecuador and states in Central America, with some services continuing on to California, United States. While ships of the Kosmos Line offered some passenger accommodations, they operated mainly as cargo carriers, with principle imports of the Line to Germany in this period including saltpetre, grain and tin.

In September 1911, Rhakotis was stranded in the Scheldt on an outbound voyage, but was successfully refloated by lighterage and permitted to proceed.

Following the outbreak of World War I in July 1914, Rhakotis violated Chilean neutrality by departing Valparaíso on 12 November secretly loaded with engine-room stores for Admiral Graf Spee's East Asia Squadron, which included the cruiser SMS Dresden, joining it on the 17th. During the rendezvous, the captive crew of the British collier North Wales, sunk by Dresden a day earlier, was transferred to Rhakotis. On 14 December, Rhakotis arrived at Callao, Peru, where she landed the British crew. Rhakotis was subsequently interned at Callao, her internment continuing for the next 3 1/2 years.

=== Seizure and transfer to U.S. control, June 1918 – April 1919 ===
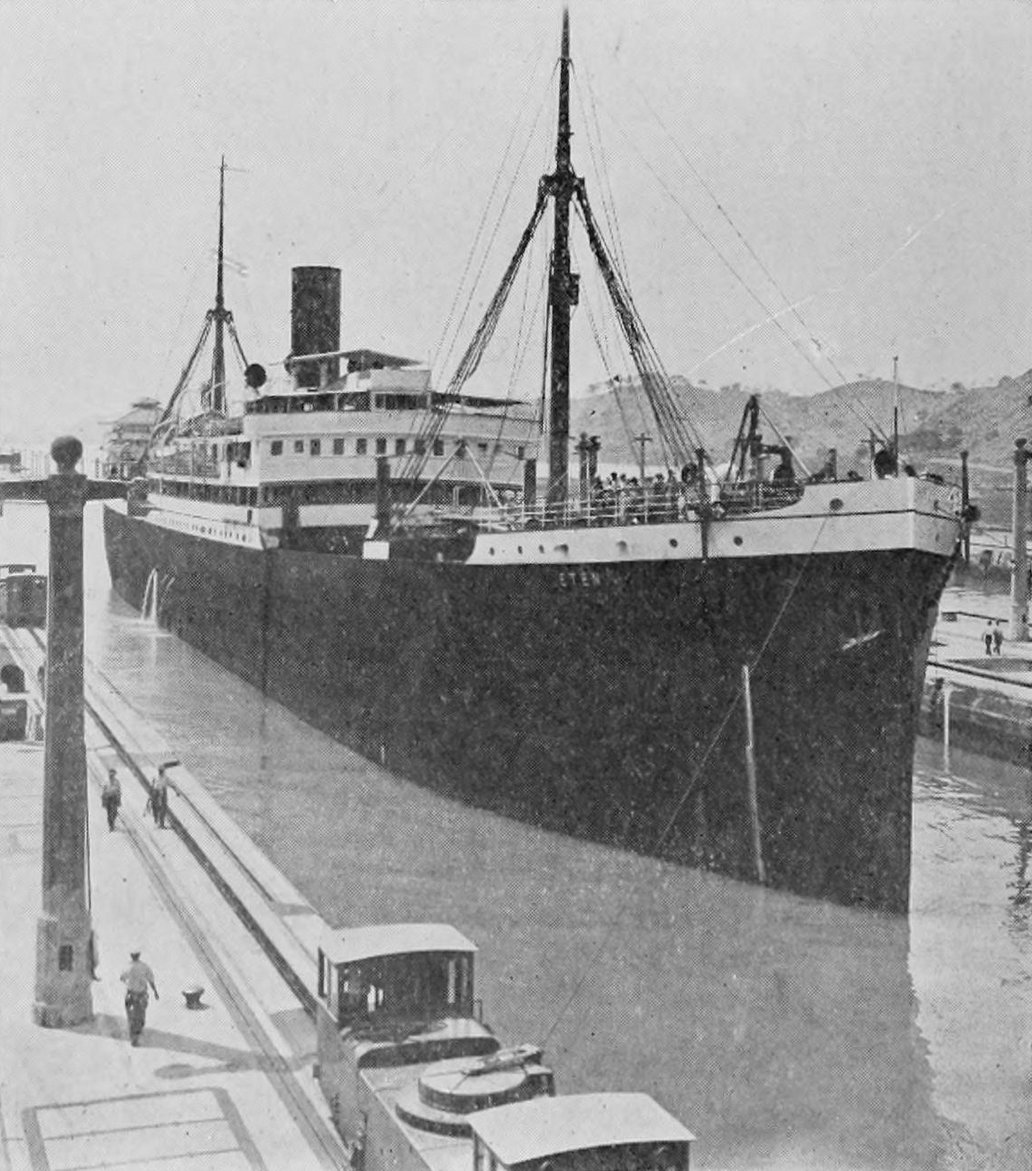
SS Eten in a lock of the Panama Canal, shortly before her conversion to a troopship in 1919

In September 1917, acting on information that the German ships interned in Peruvian waters, including Rhakotis, were being sabotaged by their crews to prevent their possible use by Allied forces, the Peruvian military placed the ships under armed guard, though too late to completely prevent the sabotage. Peru and Germany severed diplomatic ties a few days later. By this time, the worldwide wartime shipping shortage had deprived Peru of the tonnage needed to maintain its coastal and international commerce, and in 1918 the Peruvian government decided to seize and utilize the German ships interned in Peruvian ports as a stopgap measure.

Lacking both the facilities and the capital to repair the ships, the Peruvian government proposed to charter them to the United States. Under the proposal the U.S. would repair the ships, with the cost of repairs deducted from the charter fee, after which a small percentage of the tonnage (Note: Specifically, 17,000 tons out of the total seized tonnage of 61,900 tons, or about 27.5%.) would be returned to Peru for its own use, while the US would operate the remaining ships with any resulting profits split on a 50/50 basis. This proposal was accepted by the U.S., and in September 1918 the agreement was effected on a bareboat charter basis, with Rhakotis and five other German ships seized by the Peruvians coming under control of the United States Shipping Board (USSB).

On the same day the charter agreement was signed, Rhakotis, along with another ship formerly belonging to the Kosmos Line, Sierra de Cordoba, were taken in tow at Callao by the American tug Culebra for transfer to the American settlement of Balboa, Panama Canal Zone, where the repairs would be effected; three more ex-Kosmos Line ships would later join them. At Balboa, damage to the machinery of the five ships was assessed as serious but not irreparable, with the main and auxiliary engine cylinders and valves having been broken, and the boilers damaged by "dry firing".

Repairs to the five ships took some months, by which time the war was over. However, with the foreign contingent of the American Cruiser and Transport Force having withdrawn at the close of the war, the United States now needed additional ships to repatriate its victorious armies from France, and Rhakotis—renamed Eten by the USSB—became one of 56 ships selected for conversion to troop transports. In April, she departed Balboa for conversion work in New York.

=== U.S. Navy troop transport, April–August 1919 ===
Eten was converted to a troop transport at Hoboken, New Jersey, by W. & A. Fletcher Co. between 29 April and 28 May 1919, at a cost of $144,000. On 1 May, while work on the vessel was still in progress, Eten was formally transferred from USSB to Navy control and commissioned the same day as USS Eten (ID-4041). After conversion, USS Eten had a crew complement of 21 officers and 168 men, (Note: The source misspells the ship name as "Etin".) and a troop carrying capacity of 80 officers and 1,761 enlisted men.

Assigned to the Cruiser and Transport Force, USS Eten departed New Jersey the day after the completion of conversion work, 29 May, for St. Nazaire, France, where she embarked U.S. troops. After returning to the United States, a second voyage to France was made, returning 31 July (Note: The source misspells the ship name as "Etten".) to Newport News, Virginia. A total of 3,296 troops, including 46 sick or wounded, were returned by Eten to the United States on these two round trips.

From Newport News, USS Eten departed for Norfolk on 5 May. There on 19 August she was decommissioned and returned to USSB control.

=== U.S. merchant service, 1919–21 ===
Following decommission, SS Eten departed Virginia for New York, arriving 9 September 1919. The vessel was then chartered from the USSB by the United States & Australia Line, which intended to use the ship to "test the passenger and freight service between South Africa and the Atlantic ports of the United States." After minor repairs, Eten commenced her first voyage for the company, from New York to South Africa, on 9 October.

At least three round trips between New York and South Africa were completed by Eten to June 1920, the third of which was to Cape Town. In April of the same year, Australia's Daily Commercial News and Shipping List described Eten as "a fine type of the combined passenger and cargo boat. She is very comfortably fitted in all respects. The cabins are spacious, while the drawing, smoking and other lounge rooms suggest that the vessel was originally designed for trade in the tropics." The paper reports that while Eten's operators were readily filling the ship's 80 passenger berths, making the South African experiment "successful enough to warrant continuance", cargoes in both directions had been light, prompting the USSB to consider expanding Eten's passenger accommodations from 80 to 360. One factor discouraging such work, however, was the ship's speed of "only a little above the old twelve knots an hour." The USSB was also said to be considering purchasing the vessel from the Peruvian government. It is not known whether Eten's passenger accommodations were ever expanded as proposed, but Eten was not purchased by the USSB and continued to operate under the Peruvian flag.

In November 1920, while returning to New York via South America, a powerful radio "of the telephone type", capable of transmitting over a one-thousand-mile radius, was discovered hidden in a water tank in cabin 28 of Eten's passenger berths. As the Peruvian military had disabled the ship's original radio when first interning the vessel, the discovery led to "the obvious conclusion" that the German crew may have continued communicating "with German sea raiders" during the ship's long wartime internment; the U.S. Navy was said to be preparing an investigation into the matter.

Eten is known to have been operating on the South Africa—New York route as late as February 1921, but the following year she was returned by the USSB to the Peruvian government.

=== Peruvian service, 1922–59 ===
After taking delivery of Eten from the USSB in 1922, the Peruvian government placed the steamer, renamed SS Rimac, into merchant service with Cia Peruana de Vapores y Dique del Callao, also known as the Peruvian Line. In January 1926, during a period of poor relations between Peru and Chile, a group of 36 Peruvian citizens arriving aboard Rimac at Tacna, Peru—then under Chilean control— were attacked by a Chilean mob. Many of the Peruvians were injured in the resulting melée.

On 28 February 1931, Rimac and another steamer, Apurimac, were used to transport troops loyal to Provisional President Luis Miguel Sánchez Cerro from Lima, Peru, to Mollendo, with the goal of defeating a contingent of rebel troops which had taken control of Arequipa. The loyal troops, led by Lieutenant Colonel Gustavo Jimenez and consisting of a machinegun battalion, a regiment each of cavalry, artillery and infantry and a police battalion, were given an enthusiastic send-off as they entrained at Lima by thousands of locals loyal to the regime. Before the troops were able to reach Arequipa however, Cerro was deposed in a coup on 1 March and the steamers were forced to return to Callao where the soldiers disembarked before marching on Lima and restoring Cerro to power on the 6th.

In 1934, Rimac was transferred to the Peruvian Navy for use as a transport. In January 1936, Rimac responded to an SOS from the Chilean steamer Cautin, which had run aground at Lobos de Tierra. By the time Rimac arrived, however, most of Cautin's passengers and crew had already been transferred to the American steamer Chimu.

On 18 February 1939, Peruvian President Oscar R. Benavides departed Callao in Rimac, bound for a vacation in Pisca. Shortly after, General Antonio Rodriguez, Peru's Minister of Interior and a leader of the fascist Unión Revolucionaria party, attempted with a small group of supporters to seize the Government Palace, declaring himself President in the process. Rimac was quickly ordered to return to Callao, with President Benavides sending a message from the ship denouncing the "cowards" involved in the coup attempt. Unknown to Benavides, the coup had already been crushed by troops loyal to the government, with five persons including Rodriguez himself having been shot and killed and several others wounded in skirmishing. In the aftermath of the attempted coup, remaining leaders of Unión Revolucionaria and other suspects were rounded up and jailed pending further investigation.

Rimac remained in Navy service until 1948, when she was returned to the government. In 1950, she was transferred to the Peruvian Ministry of Marine. She was broken up by Miyachi Salvage KK, Sakai, Japan, on 20 August 1959.
