= Hammerbrook =

- Quarter of Hamburg
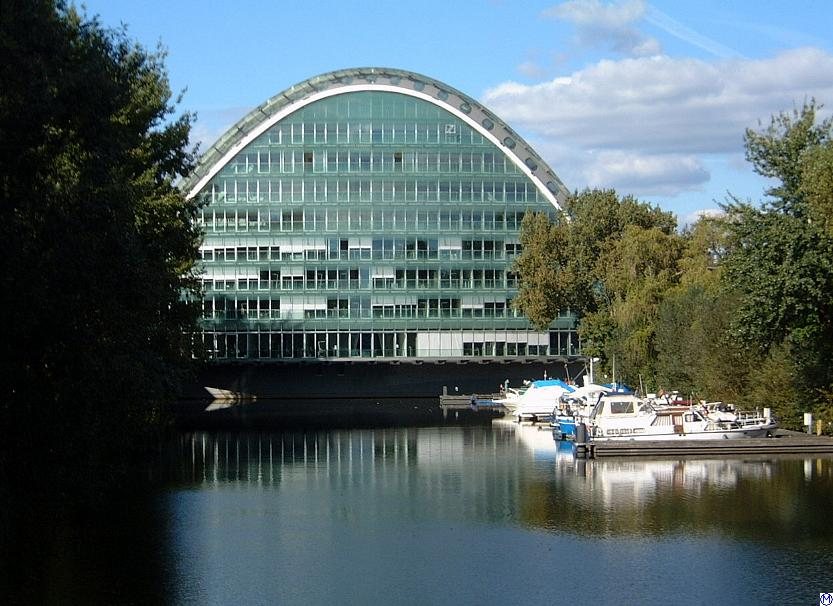
- Berliner Bogen (Berlin Arch) office building

- Location of Hammerbrook within Germany
- Coordinates: 53°32′43″N 10°1′50″E
- Country: Germany
- State: Hamburg
- Borough: Hamburg-Mitte

Area
  - Total: 2.5 km^{2} (0.97 sq mi)

Population (2024-12-31)
  - Total: 6,943
- Area code: 040
- Vehicle registration: HH

Hammerbrook (German pronunciation: [ˈhamɐbʁoːk]) is a quarter (Stadtteil) in the Hamburg-Mitte borough of the Free and Hanseatic city of Hamburg in Germany. In 2026, the population was 7,107.

== Name ==
Hamm, as in the Hamm section of the city that borders it to the east, refers to forest, while brook refers to the low-lying swamp or carr that formerly characterised the area, which is the confluence of the Bille with the Elbe. The name Hammer Brook originally referred to the entire area east of the city and north of the Bille extending as far as Horn.

== History ==
Hamburg acquired the area from the Counts of Holstein in 1383. From the 15th century onward it was administered by a Hamburg Senator as the Landherrenschaft (Lordship) of Hamm and Horn. It was used primarily as grazing land, and drainage ditches were gradually cut. A still surviving flood basin was created in the 17th century as part of the fortifications of the city. Settlement of the area began late in that century. In 1832 the western section was incorporated in the new suburb of St. Georg, while the rest was included in the Landherrenschaft of Geestlande. In 1871 this area was divided between Borgfelde and Hamm. The current quarter of Hammerbrook was administratively created in 1938 under the Greater Hamburg Act, although a section in the east became part of the then Hamm-Süd (South Hamm).

In 1840 the British engineer William Lindley proposed fully draining the area and using it for housing. After the Great Fire of Hamburg destroyed a third of the city in 1842, his plan was adopted: a grid of canals were dug, providing agricultural irrigation and also connecting the two rivers, and streets were then laid out, also on a grid pattern. Debris from the fire was used to raise the land. The district was rapidly populated as more people were displaced by slum clearance and the building of new public buildings in the decades after the fire; the new Hamburg-Bergedorf railway connected the area to the city. The population continued to grow as further slum clearance took place in the late 19th and early 20th centuries. Otto Stolten, elected from the district in 1901, was the first Socialist member of the Hamburg Parliament. In 1910 there were 60,000 inhabitants in Hammerbrook and surrounding areas, 40,000 within the borders of the modern quarter, they had themselves become overcrowded and unsanitary, and Hammerbrook was nicknamed Jammerbrook (Wailing Brook). In 1939 there were more than 27,000 inhabitants.

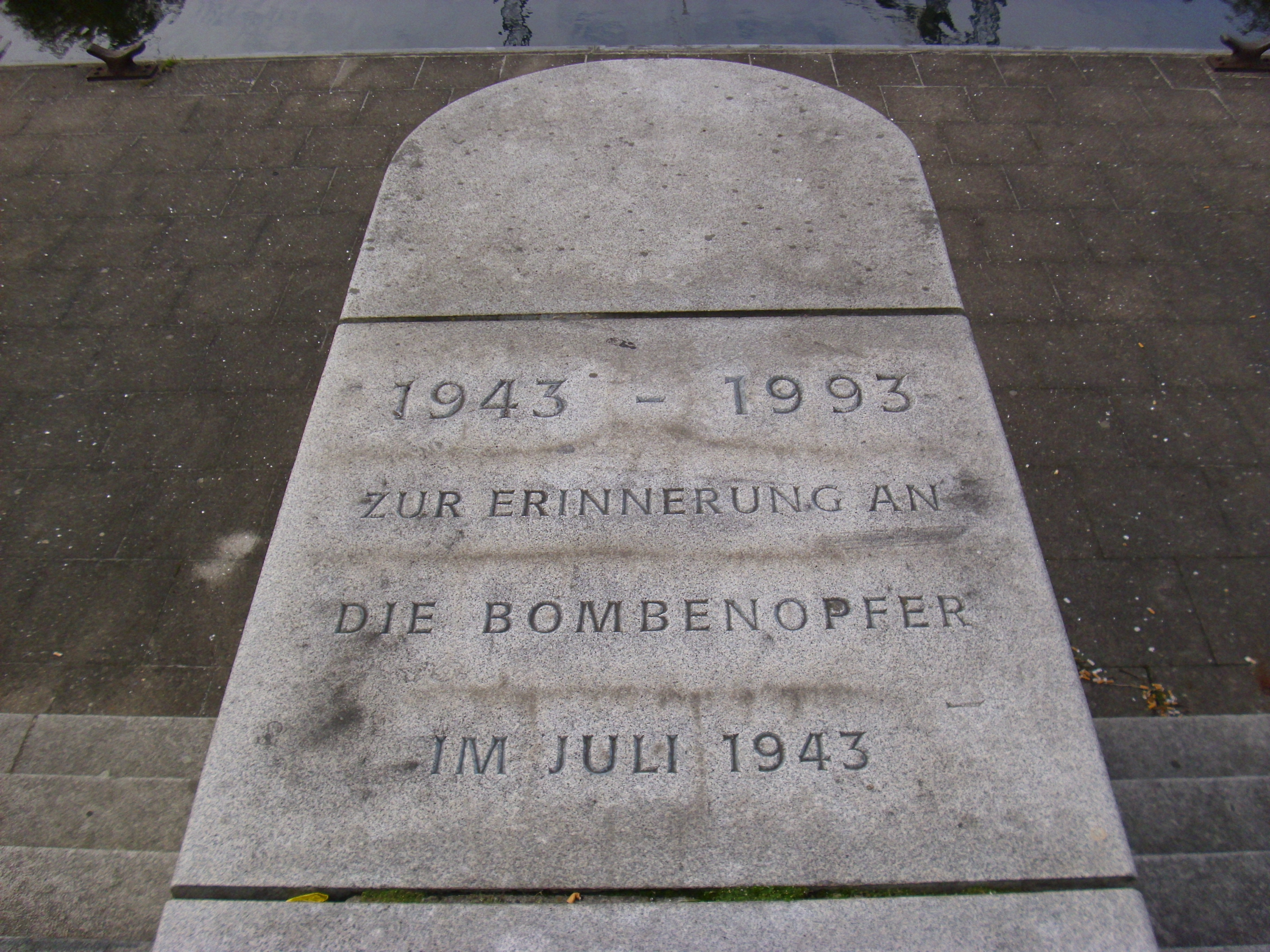
Memorial inscription to the victims of Operation Gomorrah

In the Operation Gomorrah air raids Hammerbrook was the most completely destroyed section of Hamburg. The epicentre of the firestorm of 27–28 July 1943 was on Ausschläger Weg. 36% of the residents of the district were killed, and the part west of Heidenkampsweg, which had been more than 90% destroyed, was initially closed off as a 'no-go zone' to prevent further injuries from falling masonry. After the raids a survey found fewer than 100 people still living in the area. A memorial to the Operation Gomorrah victims in Hammerbrook was erected in 1993.

After the war Hammerbrook's population remained small. The Hamburg U-Bahn line to Rothenburgsort, which had been destroyed, was not rebuilt. The city set aside the now largely open area for commercial uses, but businesses built office blocks. In the 1980s one section was successfully advertised as an area for offices under the name City Süd (South City).

== Geography ==
As of 2007, Hammerbrook has an area of 1.6 km^{2} (0.62 sq mi), and is part of the Hamburg-Mitte borough.

== Demographics ==
In 2006 there were 435 people living in the Hammerbrook quarter. The population density was 281/km^{2} (728/sq mi). 8.5% were children under the age of 18, and 8.3% were 65 years of age or older. Resident aliens were 47.6% of the population. 20 people were registered as unemployed.

In 1999 there were 410 households, out of which 10.5% had children under the age of 18 living with them and 63.4% of all households were made up of individuals. The average household size was 1.62.

== Politics ==
These are the results of Hammerbrook in the Hamburg state election:

Election	Greens	SPD	Left	CDU	FDP	AfD	Others
2020	34,0 %	23,5 %	16,1 %	6,9 %	5,2 %	3,0 %	11,4 %
2015	22,2 %	26,3 %	21,3 %	7,3 %	3,4 %	4,2 %	15,3 %
2011	22,5 %	35,4 %	27,6 %	9,3 %	4,4 %	–	15,4 %
2008	21,1 %	36,3 %	10,6 %	20,3 %	5,4 %	–	5,7 %
2004	35,1 %	25,5 %	–	26,9 %	3,8 %	–	8,7 %

== Transport ==
The quarter has good road connections: it is close to the Elbe bridges and three major roads leading to the centre of the city pass through it. Hammerbrook station on the Hamburg S-Bahn was built in 1978–83.

== Notes ==
=== References ===
- Selectable database: Statistical office Hamburg and Schleswig-Holstein Statistisches Amt für Hamburg und Schleswig-Holstein. (in German)
