= Murder of Morsal Obeidi =

Murder of German-Afghan teen in Hamburg, Germany

Morsal Obeidi
- Born: 7 September 1991; Mazar-i-Sharif, Republic of Afghanistan
- Died: 15 May 2008 (aged 16); Hamburg, Germany
- Resting place: Friedhof Öjendorf, Hamburg
- Education: Ernst-Henning-Strasse Schule
- Known for: Being the victim of an honour killing in Hamburg

Morsal Obeidi (Dari: مرسال عابدي 7 September 1991 – 15 May 2008) was a German-Afghan girl who was murdered in an honour killing in Hamburg. Her brother Ahmad Sobair Obeidi killed her, making it an act of sororicide, and he was jailed for life for the act.

== Background ==
Obeidi was born on 7 September 1991 in Mazar-i-Sharif, Afghanistan. Her father, Ghulam-Mohammed Obeidi, a member of the Afghan Communist Party, piloted military aircraft. He left the country as pro-Soviets lost control of Afghanistan at the end of the Soviet–Afghan War, and in 1992 arrived in Hamburg, which already had a sizeable expatriate Afghan population. Morsal, then three, and her brother, Ahmad-Sobair Obeidi, then ten, came to Germany two years later. She, her brother, and her other family members became German citizens. She also had an older sister.

According to Der Spiegel, the family lived in an average neighbourhood in Rothenburgsort, Hamburg-Mitte. Morsal attended Ernst-Henning-Strasse Schule, a primary and junior high school in Bergedorf, then a vocational high school. When the headmaster of the latter told her that her academic performance was such that she could not graduate on time, her parents took her out of school. Her brother's first law enforcement record was at age 13, and he left school and did not gain a sufficient command of German. He had committed multiple burglaries and assaults on others, and for these crimes, in 2009, German courts had convicted him on thirty counts total. Her father, who became a bus driver, had difficulty obtaining high quality employment and assimilating into German society, and he criticized Morsal for assimilating too much and Ahmad for committing crimes. Ahmad wanted her to lead an Islamic lifestyle, something she did not do; he believed his sister should not lead a hedonistic lifestyle that he himself had led.

Law enforcement records stated that the father and brother began to abuse her, and she sought help from Hamburg's Children's and Youth Emergency Service (Kinder- und Jugendnotdienst or KJND). In March 2007 her family sent her to Mazar-i-Sharif to Islamize her, and she stayed there for nine months before returning on the condition of obedience. The family later moved to Flensburg in the state of Schleswig-Holstein, and she tried living with them there, but left again. For a period of over one year she lived in a shelter for minors facing abuse from their families.

Ahmad was convicted of a crime and sentenced to a prison term of one year and five months in October 2007; he had no parole eligibility. The court ordered him to report to prison on 2 May 2008 but he did not begin his sentence at that time. On 9 May, his lawyer made a request to start the sentence at a later time, but on 15 May the court upheld the start of his sentencing. Morsal had not been in contact with Ahmad for awhile; Barbara Hans of Der Spiegel stated "But she never succeeded in entirely breaking off contact with her family."

In 2008 the father lived in Rothenburgsort.

== Crime ==
She was murdered by stabbing at age 16 by Ahmad Obeidi on 15 May 2008, in a car park of a McDonald's, by the Berliner Tor station in St. Georg, Hamburg-Mitte. Ahmad asked Mohammed, his and Morsal's cousin, to secretly arrange a meeting between the brother and sister there, but the brother did not tell Mohammed that he planned to kill his sister. The girl sustained a total of 23 stab wounds; her arms, back, legs and stomach were hit, and her heart and lungs sustained damage. Morsal died of blood loss, whilst en route to the hospital. She had received about one hour of medical attention.

Ahmad Obeidi believed that Morsal was working as a prostitute because he saw her socializing with other men. Der Spiegel wrote that Ahmad "resented" how his sister desired to assimilate into German society while he was a "failure in life" in what was "a foreign place".

Mohammed, after a period, went to a police station and submitted to an interrogation. He told the police that his cousin Ahmad was the culprit.

== Aftermath ==
Ahmad was arrested the next day at his residence; he did not fight against the police. Morsal was buried in an area for Muslims in a cemetery in Öjendorf, an area in the Billstedt neighbourhood in Hamburg-Mitte. The cemetery she was buried at is Friedhof Öjendorf.

In an interview on Norddeutscher Rundfunk (NDR) Ahmad's mother publicly expressed dislike for her son and his father labeled him as a criminal. Ahmad admitted to the crime; his argument to the court was that it was a crime of passion and not premeditated and therefore it would be manslaughter. In February 2008 he was convicted of murder, whilst at age 24. That month he received a life sentence in prison.

Fox News stated that the crime "sparked a renewed debate in Germany over whether Islamic families can adapt to the social ways of the Western world." German-Turkish lawyer and feminist Seyran Ateş stated that because their families find the idea of their own daughters to be expressing sexuality to be an attack on their reputations, "These are not 'so-called' honor killings, but plain and simple honor killings."

== Analysis ==
In an opinion column for The Guardian, Nushin Arbabzadah argued that the predominant explanation for the murder, "culture", is inadequate as culture is fluid and that the definition of culture differs between multiple people.

== See also ==
Honour killings in Germany:

- Hatun Sürücü

Honour killings of people with Afghan heritage:

- Anooshe Sediq Ghulam (Norway)
- Shafia family murders (Canada)
