= Murder of Anooshe Sediq Ghulam =

2002 murder in Norway

Anooshe Sediq Ghulam (1979–2002) was a 22-year-old Afghan refugee in Norway, who was murdered by her husband, Afghan Nasruddin Shamsi, in an "honour killing".

== Life and death ==
Anooshe Sediq Ghulam was an ethnic Uzbek and grew up in Mazhar-i-Sharif. She married another Uzbek, Zaheerudin Shamsi, and became his second wife. According to her own statements to the newspaper Dagbladet, she was 13 years old at the time of the marriage. According to the birth date she later gave to Norwegian authorities she was 15 or 16. The couple arrived in Norway in May 1999 as asylum seekers. They were granted permanent stay in Norway on humanitarian grounds. Anooshe Ghulam was later granted asylum. The couple had two children.

In mid-2000, she reported her husband to the police for domestic violence. He was incarcerated for a short period. Ghulam sought refuge at a women's center and filed for divorce. After this incident, Anooshe Ghulam was sent to another refugee center, Svanviken flyktningmottak, which was supposed to be a hidden address. Her husband, however, became aware of where she lived. After he was observed in an area near Ghulam, a restraining order was issued against him and he was once arrested for violating it. The murder took place outside the police station in Kristiansund 25 April 2002, when the two were on their way to court for a custody case.

Anooshe spoke fluent English and quickly picked up Norwegian. Her husband, who had been an army general and came from a prominent clan in Afghanistan's Northern Alliance, barely spoke either language.

The trial lasted 20 days and Nasruddin was sentenced to 18 years in jail. He claimed the plan originally had not been to kill Ghulam but to kill himself inside the courtroom. The two children were placed in a foster home and given police protection, due to concerns that they might be abducted by Nasruddin's family. Nasruddin's family did not come to the trial, though he has a brother living in Norway.

Norwegian authorities arranged visas for Anooshe's family in Afghanistan to come to the funeral, but they never picked them up. Apparently, they were threatened and feared reprisals by Nasruddin's family.

During the trial, Nasruddin testified that he had been a refugee in Iran and Russia, but only in Norway did the social services "meddle" with his private life. Had he known that in advance, he would not have brought his family to Norway.

== See also ==
- Murder of Morsal Obeidi
- Shafia family murders
