= Waltershof =

- Quarter of Hamburg
- Interactive map of Waltershof
- Location within Germany Location within Hamburg
- Coordinates: 53°31′40″N 9°54′2″E
- Country: Germany
- State: Hamburg
- City: Hamburg
- Borough: Hamburg-Mitte

Area
  - Total: 9.2 km^{2} (3.6 sq mi)

Population (2024-12-31)
  - Total: 0
  - Density: 0.0/km^{2} (0.0/sq mi)
- Time zone: UTC+01:00 (CET)
  - Summer (DST): UTC+02:00 (CEST)
- Dialling codes: 040
- Vehicle registration: HH

Waltershof (German pronunciation: [ˈvaltɐshoːf]) is a quarter in the Hamburg-Mitte borough of the Free and Hanseatic city of Hamburg in northern Germany. It is a part of the Port of Hamburg.

== Geography ==
Waltershof is located at the Norderelbe and Köhlbrand and is made out of the islands Griesenwerder, Mühlenwerder, Maakenwerder and Rugenbergen.

It borders the quarters Finkenwerder, Altenwerder, Steinwerder, Othmarschen, Ottensen and Altona-Altstadt.

== Politics ==
In the Hamburg Parliament voting Waltershof is a part of the electoral district of Billstedt-Wilhelmsburg-Finkenwerder. Because of the very low inhabitants the voting results are combined with the results from Finkenwerder.

== Transportation ==
In Waltershof is the southern entrance to the Elbe Tunnel and the western connection to the Köhlbrandbrücke.

It is not connected to the public train system but it has a ferry station served by HADAG ferries to the Landungsbrücken.
