= Hamburg-Mitte =

- Borough of Hamburg
- Flag

- Location of Hamburg-Mitte within Hamburg
- Interactive map of Hamburg-Mitte
- Location within Germany Location within Hamburg
- Coordinates: 53°33′1″N 9°59′39″E
- Country: Germany
- State: Hamburg
- City: Hamburg

Area
  - Total: 142.2 km^{2} (54.9 sq mi)
- Elevation: 10 m (33 ft)

Population (2024-12-31)
  - Total: 314,797
  - Density: 2,214/km^{2} (5,734/sq mi)
- Time zone: UTC+01:00 (CET)
  - Summer (DST): UTC+02:00 (CEST)
- Dialling codes: 040
- Vehicle registration: HH
- Website: www.hamburg.de

Hamburg-Mitte (German pronunciation: [ˈhambʊʁk ˈmɪtə], "Hamburg Central") is one of the seven boroughs of Hamburg, Germany, covering most of the city's urban center. The quarters of Hamburg-Altstadt and Neustadt cover much of the city's historic core. In 2020 the population was 301,231.

== History ==
In 1937 several settlements (e.g. Finkenwerder), villages and rural areas were passed into Hamburg enforced by the Greater Hamburg Act.

On 1 March 2008 due to a law of Hamburg, the quarter Wilhelmsburg was transferred from the borough Harburg. The neighborhood HafenCity was formed from parts of the quarters Klostertor, Altstadt and Rothenburgsort. The other part of Klostertor was transferred to Hammerbrook. From small parts of the borough Hamburg-Mitte (And Altona and Eimsbüttel) the neighborhood Sternschanze was created as a quarter in the borough Altona.

== Geography ==
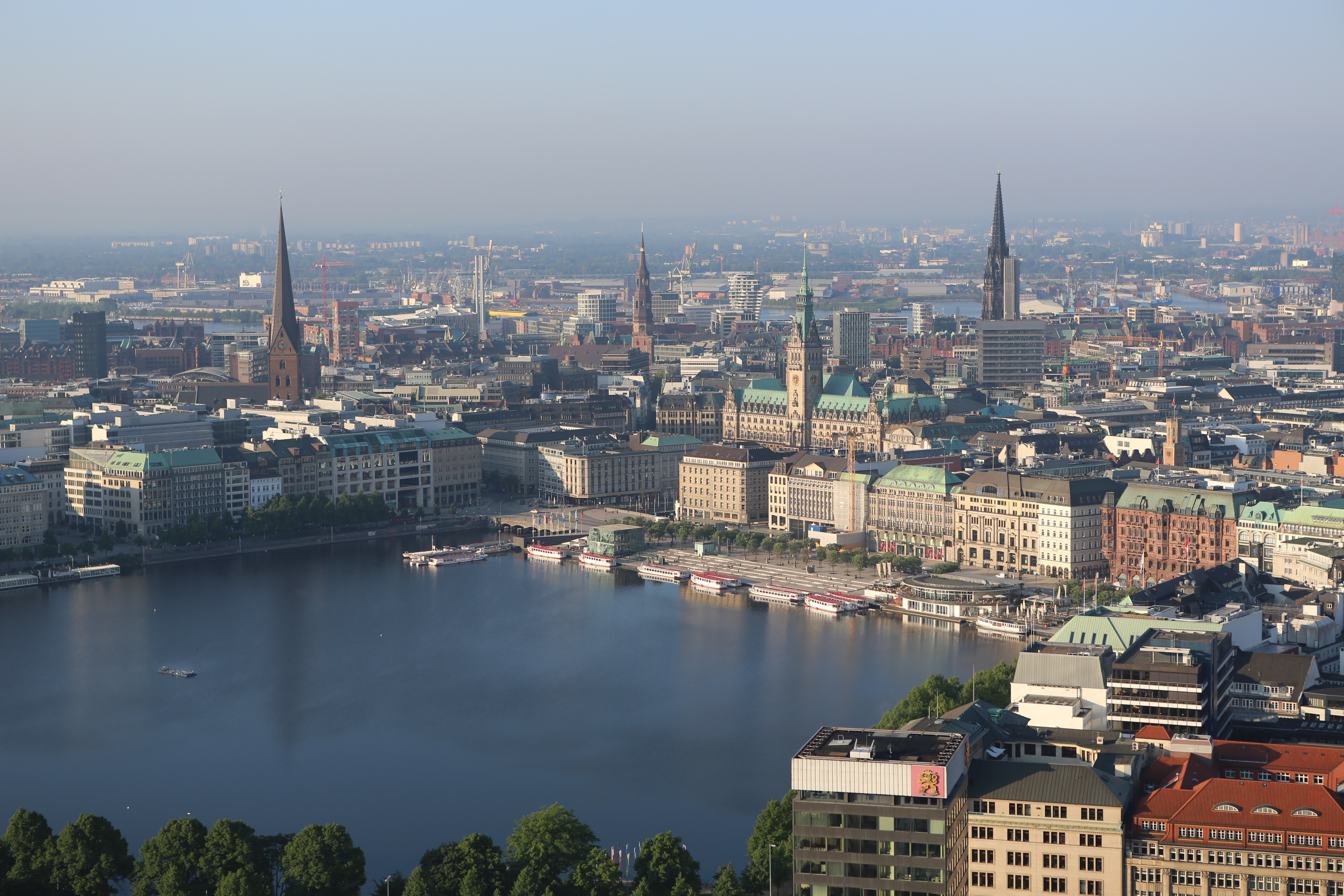
Binnenalster between Altstadt and Neustadt

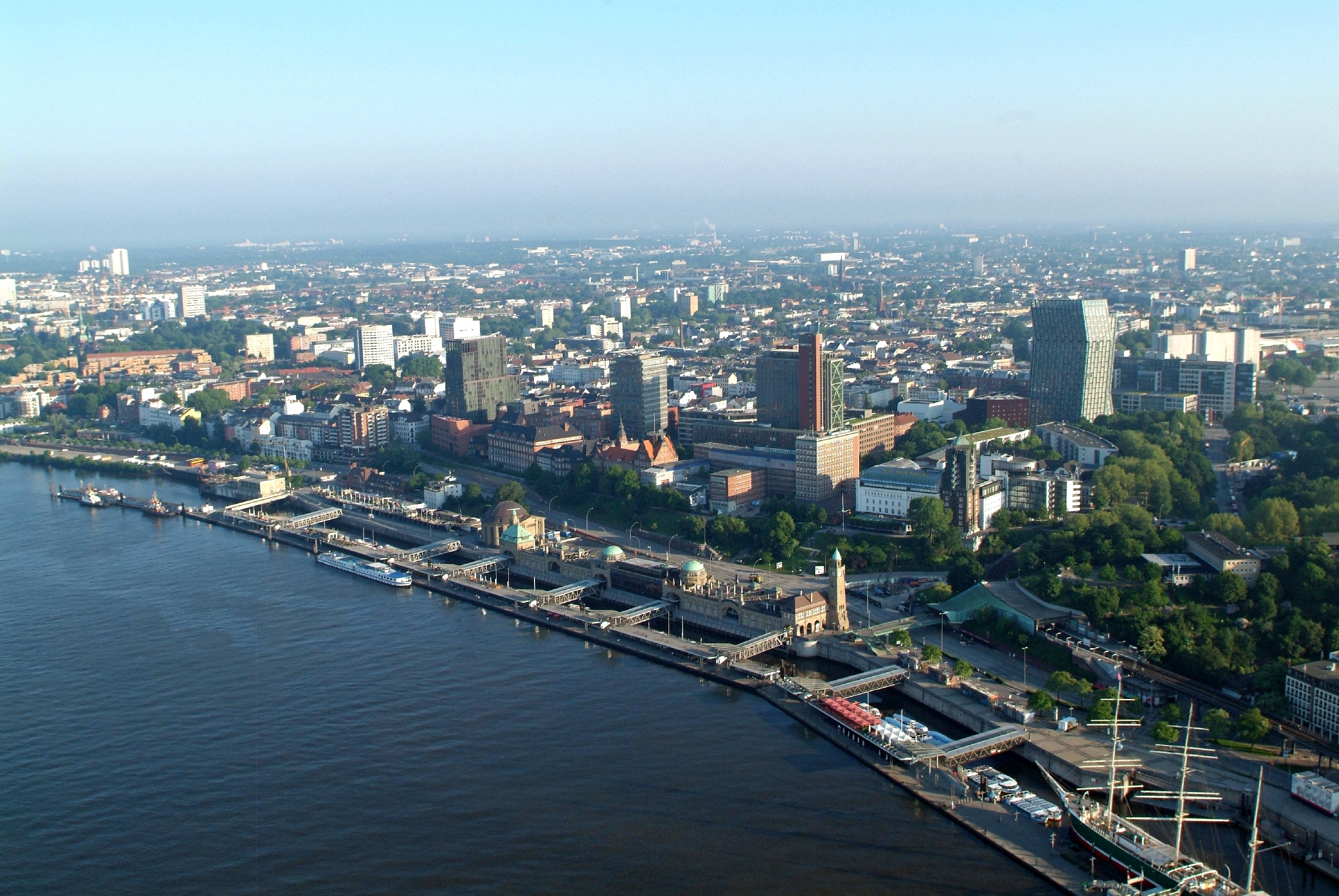
Elbe and Landungsbrücken in St. Pauli

The borough severs Hamburg from the east to the west. In 2006, according to the statistical office of Hamburg and Schleswig-Holstein, Hamburg-Mitte has a total area of 107.1 square kilometres (41 sq mi).

=== Subdivisions ===
Hamburg-Mitte consists of the quarters Billbrook, Billstedt, Borgfelde, Finkenwerder, HafenCity, Hamburg-Altstadt, Hamburg-Hamm, Hammerbrook, Horn, Kleiner Grasbrook, Neustadt, Neuwerk, Rothenburgsort, St. Georg, St. Pauli, Steinwerder, Veddel, Waltershof and Wilhelmsburg.

Map	Stadtteil
	Billbrook
	Billstedt
	Borgfelde
	Finkenwerder
	HafenCity

Map	Stadtteil
	Hamburg-Altstadt
	Hamm
	Hammerbrook
	Horn
	Kleiner Grasbrook

Map	Stadtteil
	Neustadt
	Neuwerk
	Rothenburgsort
	Steinwerder
	St. Georg

Map	Stadtteil
	St. Pauli
	Veddel
	Waltershof
	Wilhelmsburg

The historic center of Hamburg lies within the districts Altstadt, Neustadt and HafenCity, also defined by being inside the Wallring. These three districts also constitute what is considered Hamburg's Innenstadt (inner city).

=== Green and open spaces ===
Planten un Blomen (plants and flowers) is a park located in the quarter St. Pauli and Neustadt. Located in the quarter Billstedt is the lake Öjendorfer See.

== Culture ==
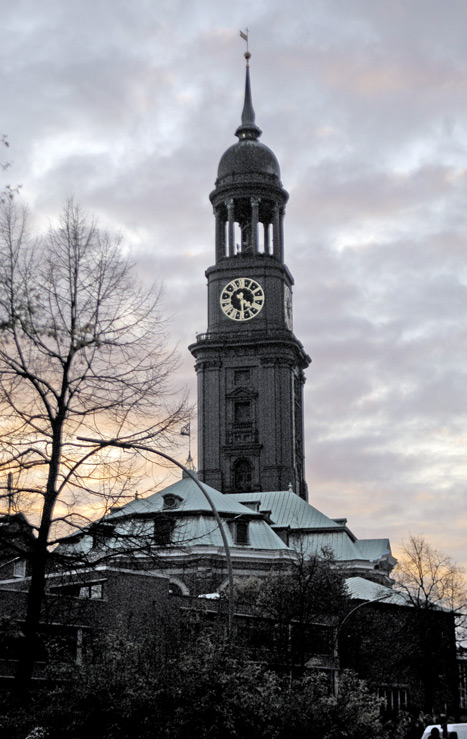
Church of St. Michaelis in 2005

== Economy ==
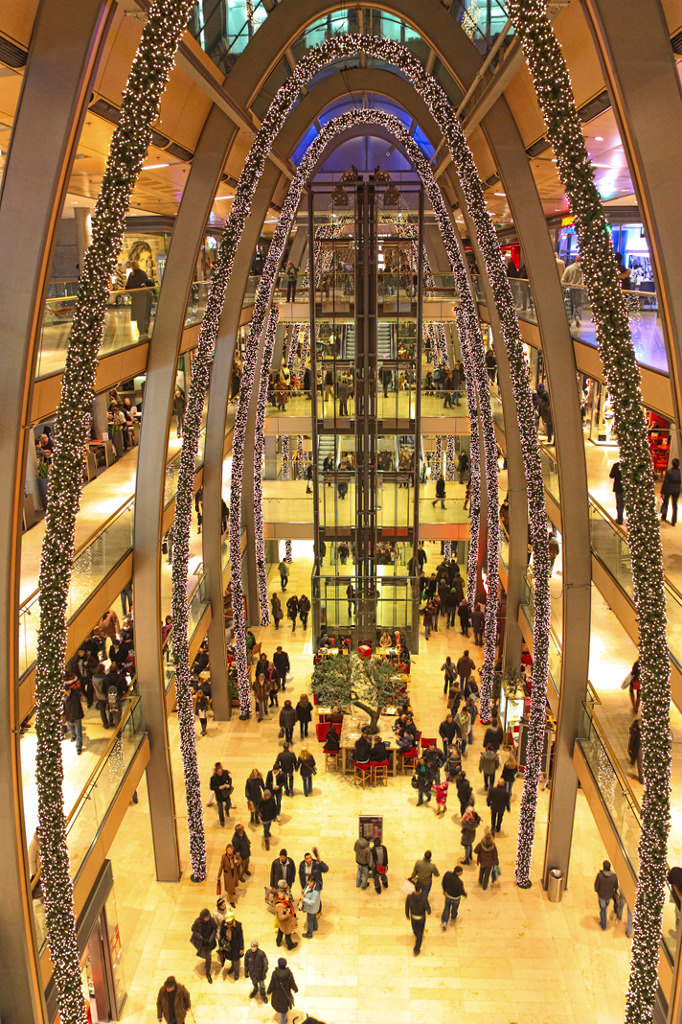
Europa-Passage between Jungfernstieg and Mönckebergstraße

Hamburg-Mitte is the economic center of Hamburg. Altstadt, Neustadt and HafenCity make up Hamburg's Innenstadt (inner city), the city's shopping and central business district, while Hammerbrook's City Süd is an important decentralized business district. The facilities of the Port of Hamburg are located mostly in Hamburg-Mitte in the quarters of Kleiner Grasbrook, Steinwerder, Veddel, Waltershof and Wilhelmsburg.

== Politics ==
The Bezirksamt Hamburg-Mitte is located at Klosterwall 8.

=== Diet of the borough ===
Simultaneously with elections to the state parliament (Bürgerschaft), the Bezirksversammlung is elected as representatives of the citizens. It consists of 53 representatives.

=== Elections ===
District parliament election of Mitte in 2024
Parties	%	±	Seats
Social Democratic Party	28.5	▲1.5	14
Alliance 90/The Greens	21.1	▼8.2	11
Christian Democratic Union	15.6	▲3.5	8
The Left	14.8	▼0.8	8
Alternative for Germany	10.2	▲2.5	5
Volt	5.1	▲5.1	3
Free Democratic Party	4.8	± 0.0	2
Total			51

== Demographics ==
In 2006, 233,144 people lived in the borough. The population density was 2,177/km^{2} (5,638/sq mi). 14.9% were children under the age of 18, and 15.6% were 65 years of age or older. 43% belong to ethnic minorities. 17,550 people were registered as unemployed and 72,608 were employees subject to social insurance contributions.

In 1999 there were 126,753 households, out of which 17.9% had children under the age of 18 living with them and 52.4% of all households were made up of single occupants. The average household size was 1.83.

Population by year

1987	1988	1989	1990	1991	1992	1993	1994	1995	1996	1997	1998	1999
232,467	235,759	242,434	249,156	250,585	252,695	251,965	248,802	246,374	242,029	237,648	230,542	228,349

2000	2001	2002	2003	2004	2005	2006	2007	2008	2009
228,060	227,199	227,915	228,117	227,557	230,680	233,114			

In 2006 there were 71,559 criminal offences in borough (307 crimes per 1000 people).

== Infrastructure ==
The main local office (Bezirksamt Hamburg-Mitte) is located on Klosterwall. It has 4 local offices or "Customer Centres." These are Customer Centre Hamburg-Mitte, Customer Centre Billstedt, Customer Centre St. Pauli, and Customer Centre Wilhelmsburg. The offices are responsible, among other things, for the application for a residence permit for purposes of study after entering the country.

=== Government ===
The Federal Maritime and Hydrographic Agency of Germany (BSH) has its head office in St. Pauli in Hamburg-Mitte, and the head office of Federal Bureau for Maritime Casualty Investigation is in the BSH facility.

=== Education ===
The borough has 31 elementary schools and 31 secondary schools.

=== Health systems ===
There were 125 day-care centers for children and 536 physicians in private practice and 72 pharmacies. The Asklepios Klinik St. Georg located in the quarter St. Georg, is the main hospital in Hamburg-Mitte.

=== Transport ===
The borough is serviced by the rapid transit system of the city train and the underground railway with several stations. The central station Hamburg Hauptbahnhof is also for long-distance passenger trains for the German railway company.

According to the Department of Motor Vehicles (Kraftfahrt-Bundesamt), in the Hamburg-Mitte borough 66,831 private cars were registered (290 cars/1000 people). There were 2,432 traffic accidents in total, including 1,905 traffic accidents resulting in injuries.

== Notable residents ==
- Morsal Obeidi (murder victim), Rothenburgsort
