= Steinwerder =

- Quarter of Hamburg
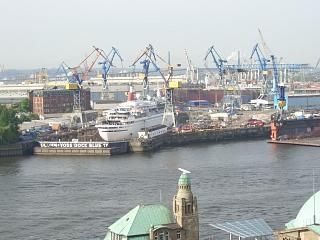
- The Blohm+Voss shipyard with dry dock Elbe 17

- Location of Steinwerder in Hamburg
- Interactive map of Steinwerder
- Location within Germany Location within Hamburg
- Coordinates: 53°32′4″N 9°57′26″E
- Country: Germany
- State: Hamburg
- City: Hamburg
- Borough: Hamburg-Mitte

Area
  - Total: 10.4 km^{2} (4.0 sq mi)

Population (2024-12-31)
  - Total: 37
  - Density: 3.6/km^{2} (9.2/sq mi)
- Time zone: UTC+01:00 (CET)
  - Summer (DST): UTC+02:00 (CEST)
- Dialling codes: 040

Steinwerder (German pronunciation: [ʃtaɪnˈvɛʁdɐ]; German "stein" stone, "werder" (archaic) island or peninsula, translation "stone peninsula") is a quarter of Hamburg, Germany in the borough Hamburg-Mitte on the southern bank of the river Elbe. It is a primarily maritime industrial location, with a resident population in 2017 of only 39.

Local landmarks include two music theatres, the Steinwerder ends of the Old Elbtunnel and Köhlbrand Bridge, and the shipyard of Blohm+Voss in which the old Pilot House still stands.

Until 1946, the name was written as Steinwärder. (See also German wikipedia). It seems to have lent this name to a ship built in 1848 in Altona (on the opposite side of the harbour). This ship was notable for 5 migration voyages from Hamburg to Port Adelaide between 1849 and 1863, after which it was sold and renamed.

== Geography ==
The former island of Steinwerder lies at the confluence of the North Elbe with the Köhlbrand.

Together with the neighbouring district of Kleiner Grasbrook, Steinwerder forms the eastern part of the port of Hamburg. The district comprises the port and associated industrial and commercial areas, including shipyards. There is little or no residential housing.

== Economy ==
Steinwerder's economy is dominated by its port and associated maritime industries. Hamburg, including Steinwerder, has taken the relatively unusual step of regenerating and expanding its maritime operations rather than redeveloping the waterfront for other uses.

== Transport ==
The Old Elbe Tunnel has linked Steinwerder to St. Pauli on the northern river bank since 1911 and is open to both road vehicles and pedestrians.

The Köhlbrand Bridge connects Steinwerder with Waltershof to the west, linking the two halves of the port. It is the second longest bridge in Germany, being opened in 1974.

== Landmarks ==
=== Pilot house ===
In 1902 a brick house with a round tower was built for the Hamburg harbour pilots. When the pilots moved elsewhere, in 1925 Blohm & Voss took it over. It is nowadays surrounded by dockyards and is only visible from the river Elbe.

=== Twin music theatres ===
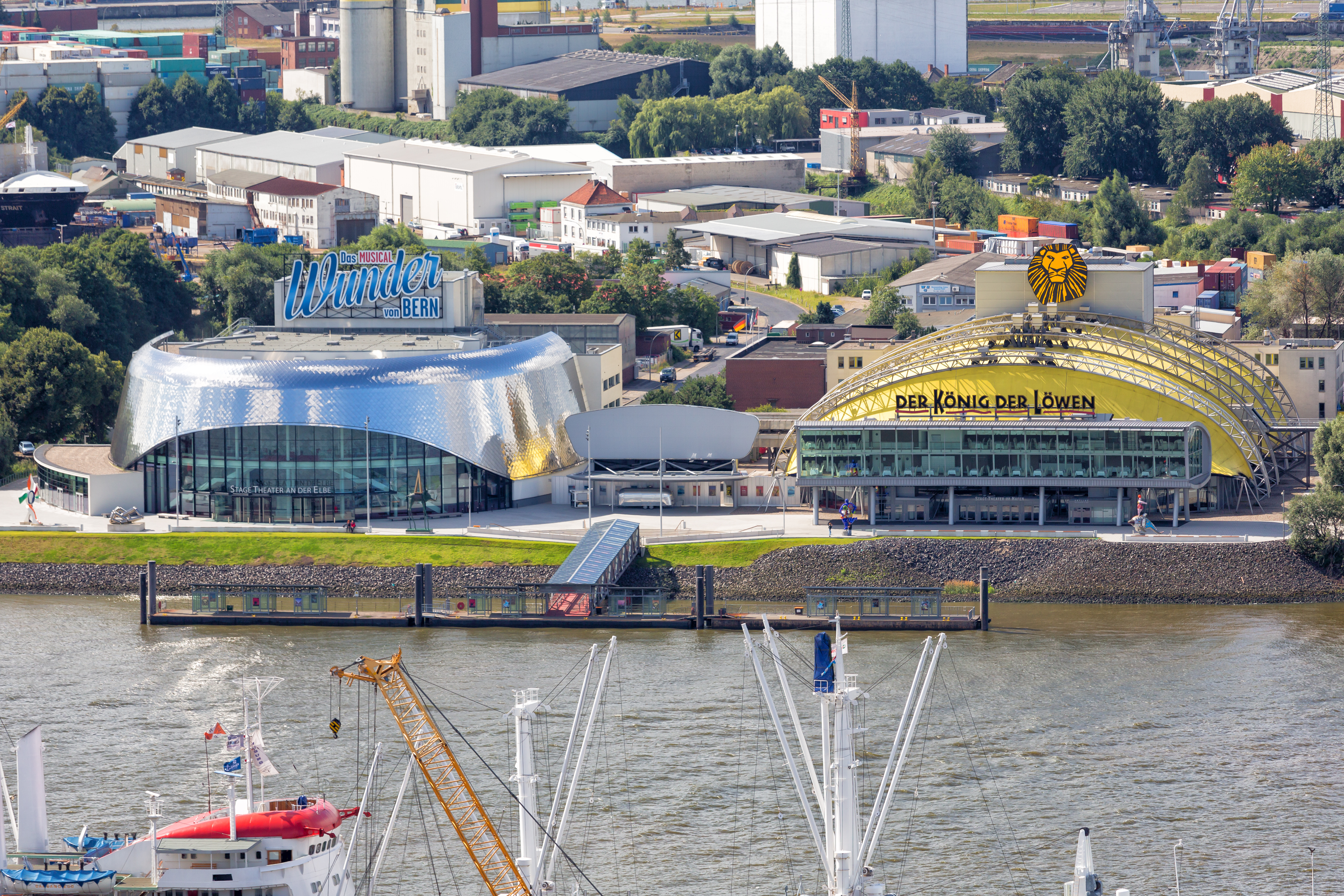
Theater an der Elbe (left) and Theater im Hafen (right) seen from the Elbe

In the north of the district, on the site of the former Stülcken shipyard, the Stage Theater im Hafen (Stage Theatre in the Harbour) was built in 1994. Then in 2013 a second music theatre, the Stage Theater an der Elbe (Stage Theatre on the Elbe) was built next to it.

== History ==
Steinwerder was once called Nordersand (North Sands) and was an island until the dike-building of the Middle Ages brought it into use as farmland.

After the Great Fire of 1842 so much rubble was dumped on the island that it was raised significantly above river level. This led to the change of name to "Stone island".

In the mid-19th century the first shipyards appeared in the district. A decisive turning point came in 1877 with the founding of the shipyard Blohm & Voss. More followed. At the turn of the century, the harbour was further expanded.

In 1894 Steinwerder was incorporated as a district and in 1902 officially adopted its current name.

Steinwerder was badly damaged during the bombing of Hamburg in World War II. After the Second World War, the British continued to demolish the shipyards of Steinwerder. Many of the large shipyards, including Stülcken and Schlieker, have disappeared and B&V is smaller than it used to be.

=== Blohm & Voss ===
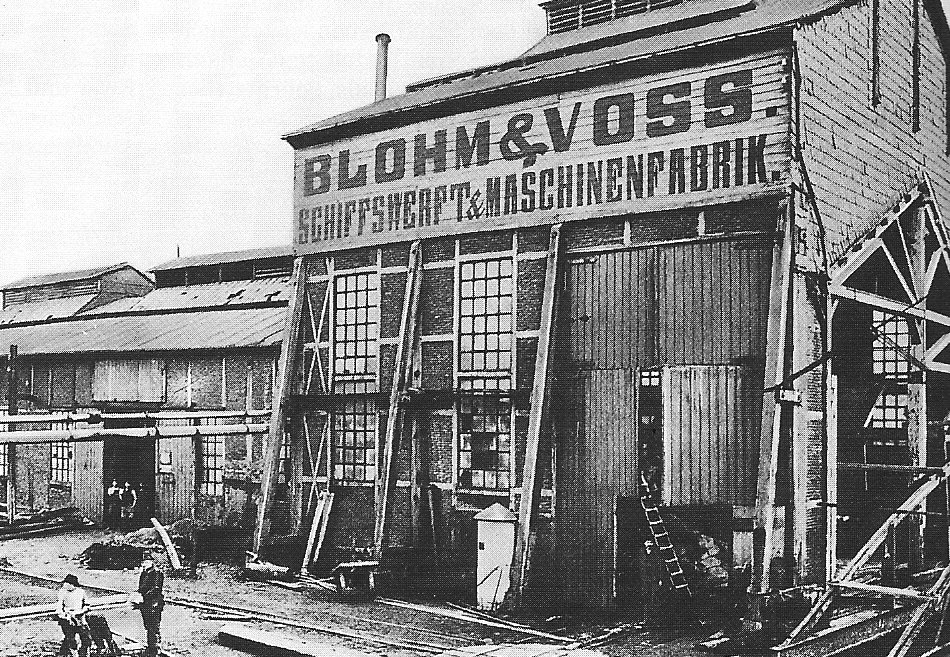
Blohm & Voss in 1877

Founded in 1877 by Hermann Blohm and Ernst Voss, Blohm & Voss (B&V) quickly rose to become Hamburg's biggest shipyard. Specialising in steel-hulled ships, these were originally all sailing vessels and only later did the engine business develop. The company built, maintained and repaired ships of all sizes in its shipyards. Most notable was the World War II battleship the Bismarck, at which time B&V was the largest shipyard in Germany.

In 1932 Hermann Blohm's sons founded the Hamburger Flugzeugbau (HFB) to make all-metal aeroplanes in the shipyards, which were suffering from the global depression. For several years the HFB offices occupied the top floor of the B&V main headquarters in Steinwerder and the aircraft were manufactured at the Steinwerder works. When shipbuilding picked up again in the late 1930s the aircraft work was moved elsewhere. At around the same time, the aircraft business was reorganised as a subsidiary of Blohm & Voss.

During the war the B&V site became a subcamp of Neuengamme concentration camp.

B&V's fortunes revived in 1952 when the City of Hamburg guaranteed credit to the B&V subsidiary Steinwerder Industrie AG, formed in 1950, to restart ship repairs and by 1953 some 900 workers were back in employment.

B&V diversified into private yachts and offshore oil installations. The Eclipse built for the Russian billionaire Roman Abramovich is, at 162 metres (531 ft 6 in) in length, the second-longest private yacht in the world.

B&V is no longer in private ownership. Today it is a subsidiary of Lürssen and styles its name "Blohm+Voss".

== See also ==
- List of subcamps of Neuengamme

== Sources ==
=== Bibliography ===
- Hans Amtmann; The Vanishing Paperclips, Monogram, 1988.
- Hermann Pohlmann; Chronik Eines Flugzeugwerkes 1932-1945, Motorbuch, 2nd Impression, 1982. (In German).
- "Steinwerder: Information and sights", hamburg.de (In German). (retrieved 21 February 2018)
