= Hamm, Hamburg =

Hamm
- Quarter of Hamburg
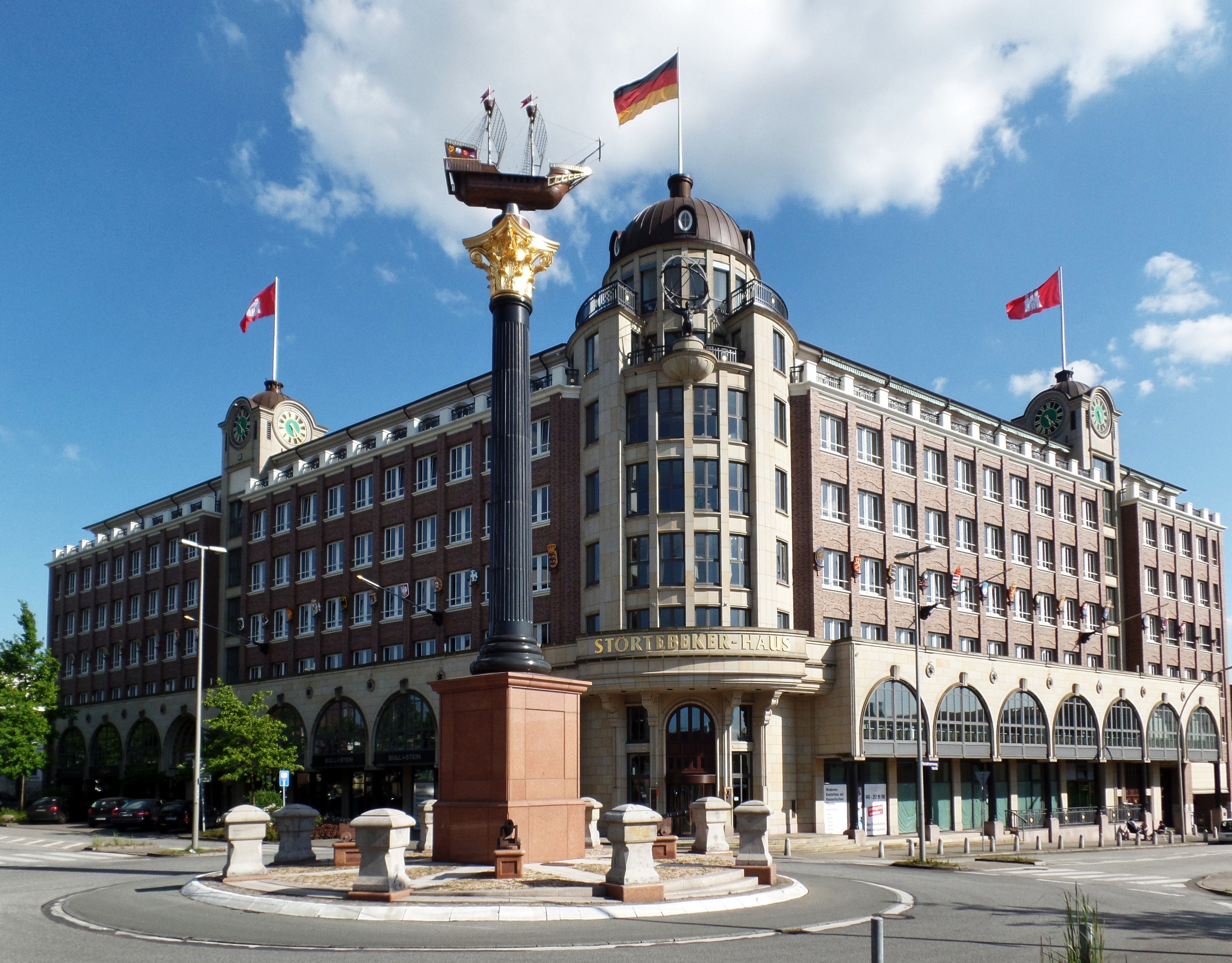
- Störtebeker-Haus

- Location of Hamm in Hamburg
- Interactive map of Hamm
- Location within Germany Location within Hamburg
- Coordinates: 53.55487°N 10.05742°E
- Country: Germany
- State: Hamburg
- City: Hamburg
- Borough: Hamburg-Mite

Area
  - Total: 3.8 km^{2} (1.5 sq mi)

Population (2024-12-31)
  - Total: 38,871
  - Density: 10,000/km^{2} (26,000/sq mi)
- Time zone: UTC+01:00 (CET)
  - Summer (DST): UTC+02:00 (CEST)
- Dialling codes: 040
- Vehicle registration: HH

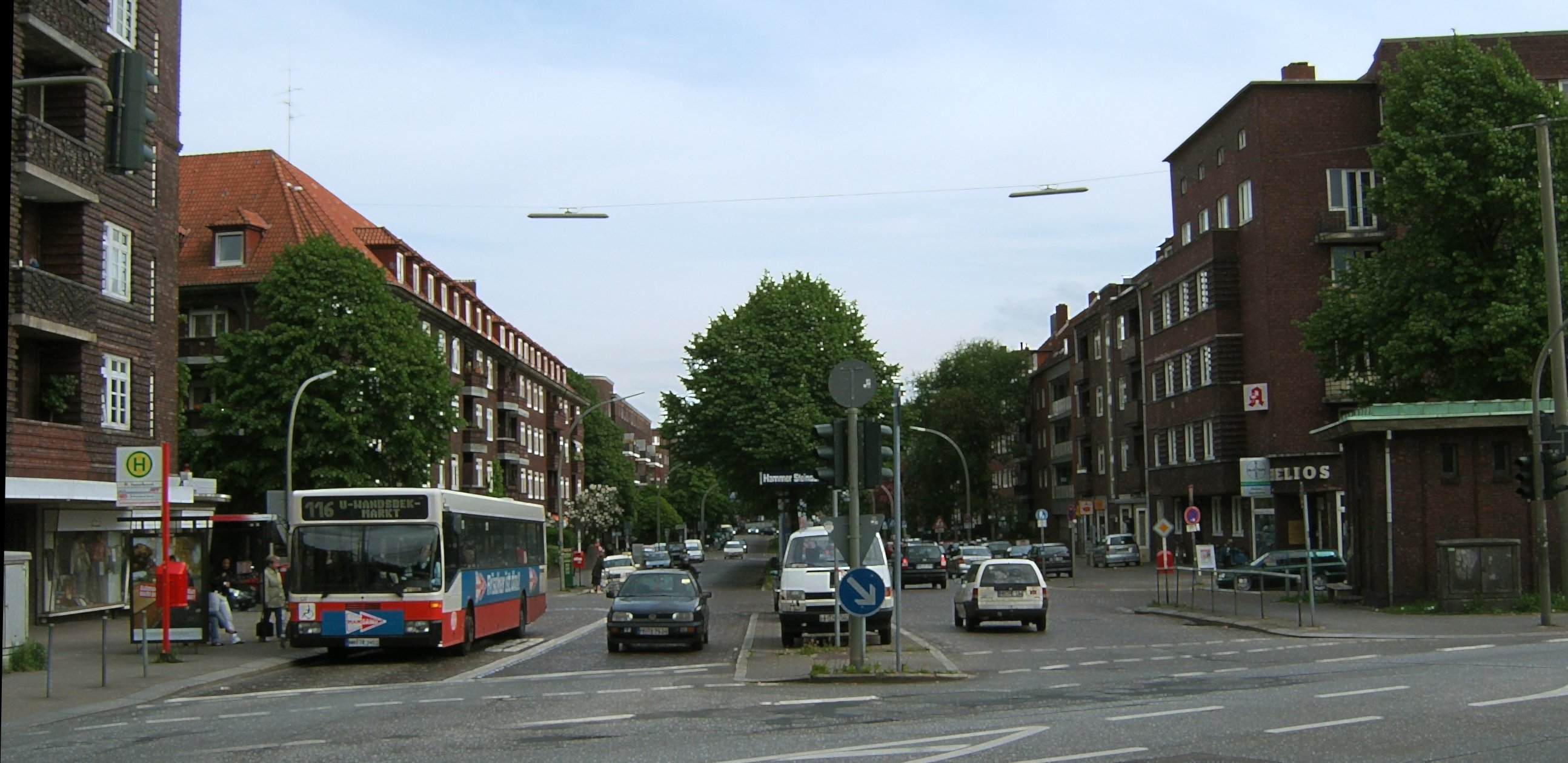
View from the street of Hammer Steindamm into Caspar-Voght-Straße

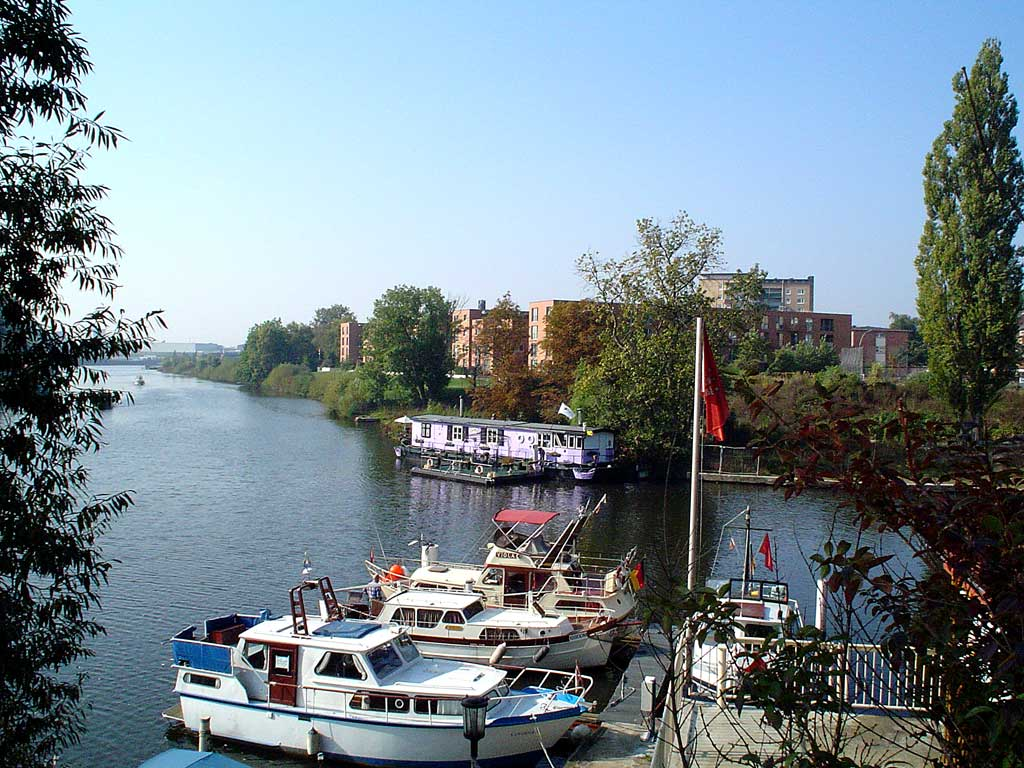
Bille river in Hamm

Hamm (German pronunciation: [ham]) is a quarter in the borough of Hamburg-Mitte, in the eastern part of Hamburg, Germany. Once a popular garden suburb of rich traders and merchants, in the first half of the 20th century it grew to become one of the most populated quarters of Hamburg. In the Second World War, however, the area was mostly flattened. As of 2020 the population was 37,989.

Between 1951 and 2010 Hamm was subdivided into three neighborhoods: Hamm-Nord, -Mitte und -Süd (Hamm-North, -Middle, and South). On 1 January 2011, this subdivision was repealed and the three were again combined.

== Demographics ==
As of 2013 Hamm had 26,122 households. The majority of inhabitants, 73.9%, were between 18 and 65. The proportion of immigrants was 32.9%, significantly lower than in Hamburg-Mitte as a whole (45.3%).

== Politics ==
These are the results of Hamm in the Hamburg state election:

Election	SPD	Greens	Left	CDU	AfD	FDP	Others
2020	35,6 %	27,6 %	12,6 %	6,1 %	6,0 %	3,0 %	9,1 %
2015	47,5 %	12,7 %	11,3 %	10,3 %	6,7 %	4,7 %	6,8 %
2011	50,3 %	12,2 %	8,5 %	16,6 %	–	4,3 %	8,1 %
2008	38,3 %	9,2 %	7,8 %	37,1 %	–	4,1 %	3,5 %
2004	34,6 %	10,9 %	–	42,0 %	–	2,7 %	9,8 %
2001	41,5 %	7,6 %	0,5 %	22,9 %	–	3,5 %	24,0 %
1997	40,1 %	12,5 %	0,6 %	27,2 %	–	2,3 %	17,3 %
1993	44,7 %	12,1 %	–	21,8 %	–	2,8 %	18,6 %

== Religion ==
Like most of the Hamburg area, after the Reformation Hamm was mostly Lutheran. After the Church of the Trinity was built in 1693 Hamm was its own parish, which initially also comprised Horn and part of Eilbek. In the 19th and 20th centuries an increase in population led to the foundation of multiple daughter-parishes (Dankeskirche 1895, Wichernkirche 1934, Pauluskirche 1955, Simeonkirche 1965/66), some of which reunited into a larger parish (with 7400 parishioners) because of lowered membership.

Since the 1950s there have been a Catholic community (Herz Jesu Hamm) and a number of free churches (a Methodist church, a Baptist church, and an independent Evangelical-Lutheran church) in Hamm. In recent times a Greek Orthodox church and a mosque have been added.
