= St. Georg, Hamburg =

St. Georg
- Quarter of Hamburg
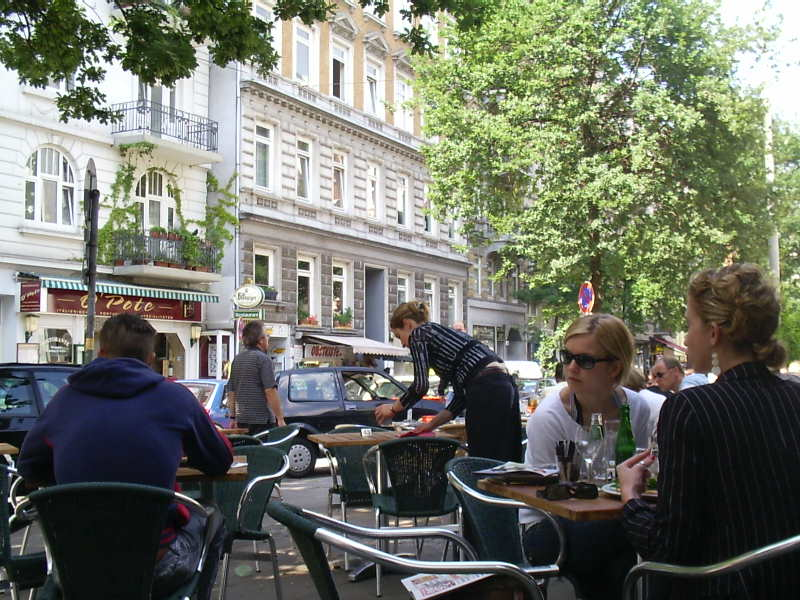
- Street café on the street Lange Reihe

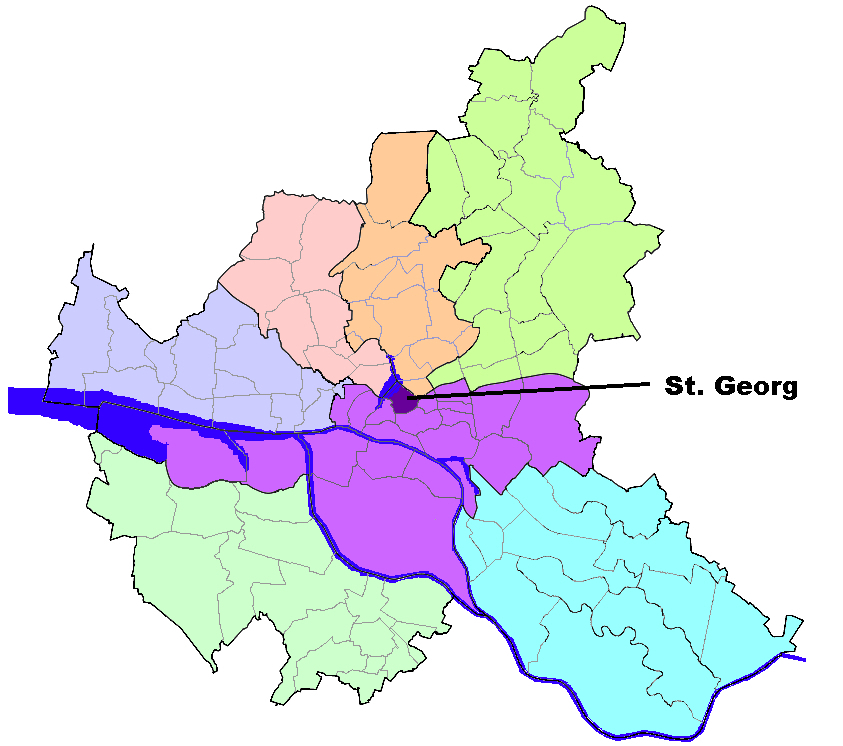
- Location of St. Georg in the city of Hamburg
- Interactive map of St. Georg
- Location within Germany Location within Hamburg
- Coordinates: 53°33′11″N 10°0′55″E
- Country: Germany
- State: Hamburg
- City: Hamburg
- Borough: Hamburg-Mitte

Area
  - Total: 1.8 km^{2} (0.69 sq mi)

Population (2024-12-31)
  - Total: 12,508
  - Density: 6,900/km^{2} (18,000/sq mi)
- Time zone: UTC+01:00 (CET)
  - Summer (DST): UTC+02:00 (CEST)
- Dialling codes: 040
- Vehicle registration: HH

St. Georg (German: [ˌzaŋkt ˈɡeːɔʁk]; sometimes spelled in full as Sankt Georg) is a central quarter in the borough Hamburg-Mitte of Hamburg, Germany. In 2020 the population was 11,349.

== History ==
In 1410 the articles 17 and 18 of a contract (Rezeß) between the Senate and the citizens were regulating the accommodation of the patients in the hospital St. Georg (S. Georg / Suente Juergens). This hospital still exists as the Asklepios Klinik St. Georg.

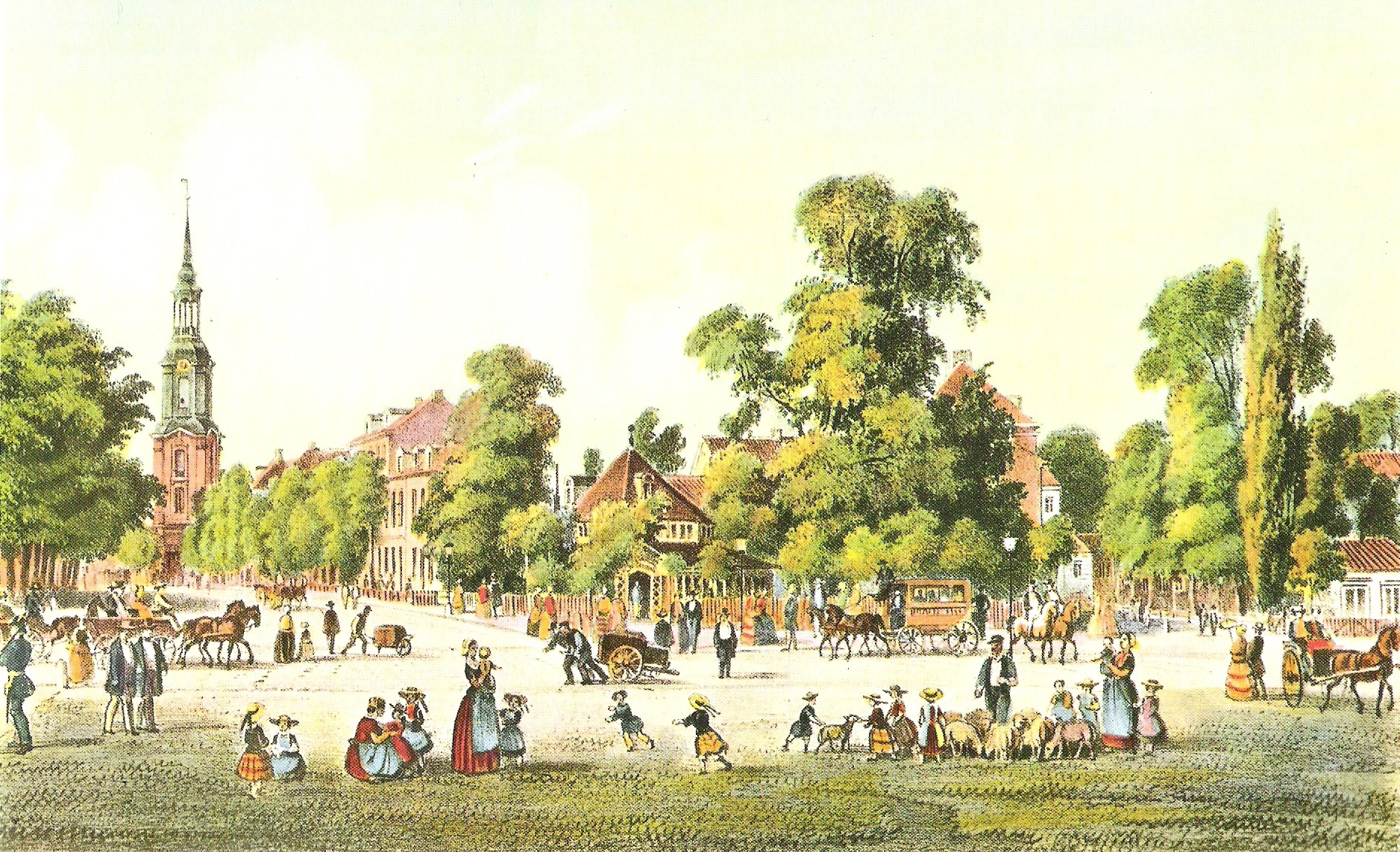
The suburb St. Georg in 1855

In 1868 the suburb St. Georg became official part of Hamburg, including the hospital for epidemic plague.

The murder of Morsal Obeidi occurred in 2008 in St. Georg.

== Geography ==
St. Georg is south-east to the artificial lake Außenalster, which is the border to the borough Eimsbüttel. According to the statistical office of Hamburg and Schleswig-Holstein, the urban quarter has a total area of 1.8 km².

Parts of the quarter St. Georg are ranked as a good address by the office of city development and environment of Hamburg. The central situation of St. Georg and many places of nightlife, street cafés and shops is the source for the gentrification in this quarter since the 1980s. The city of Hamburg and the borough Hamburg-Mitte have special programs to change this quarter.

Because of the many gay-owned and gay-friendly nightclubs, cafés and shops, St. Georg is also considered as Hamburg's main scene for gays and lesbians. In the street Lange Reihe is the starting point of Hamburg's annual Christopher Street Day parade.

== Demographics ==
In 2006 in the quarter St. Georg were living 10,551 people. 9.2% were children under the age of 18, and 13.2% were 65 years of age or older. 31.4% were immigrants. 629 people were registered as unemployed. In 1999 there were 6,882 households and 67.8% of all households were made up of individuals.

== Politics ==
These are the results of St. Georg in the Hamburg state election:

Election	Greens	SPD	Left	CDU	FDP	AfD	Others
2020	34,9 %	28,2 %	15,0 %	7,3 %	5,4 %	2,7 %	6,6 %
2015	20,8 %	36,7 %	16,7 %	8,6 %	7,6 %	3,9 %	5,7 %
2011	21,3 %	42,0 %	11,9 %	12,4 %	5,3 %	–	7,1 %
2008	17,9 %	35,7 %	10,2 %	29,8 %	4,3 %	–	2,1 %
2004	28,9 %	29,0 %	–	31,3 %	2,0 %	–	8,8 %
2001	20,4 %	37,2 %	1,0 %	16,0 %	3,8 %	–	21,6 %
1997	28,2 %	31,4 %	2,1 %	20,8 %	2,9 %	–	14,6 %
1993	27,6 %	37,4 %	–	15,3 %	2,9 %	–	16,8 %
1991	18,1 %	45,2 %	2,2 %	25,5 %	2,6 %	–	6,4 %
1987	19,1 %	44,1 %	–	31,4 %	3,8 %	–	1,6 %
1986	23,8 %	37,6 %	–	33,5 %	3,6 %	–	1,5 %
Dez. 1982	15,8 %	48,0 %	–	32,4 %	2,2 %	–	1,6 %
Juni 1982	14,9 %	41,8 %	–	36,6 %	3,8 %	–	2,9 %
1978	7,8 %	48,0 %	–	35,5 %	4,2 %	–	1,6 %
1974	–	44,1 %	–	40,9 %	8,8 %	–	6,2 %
1970	–	53,8 %	–	33,6 %	5,0 %	–	7,6 %
1966	–	57,1 %	–	30,8 %	7,2 %	–	4,9 %

== Religion ==
The Domkirche St. Marien (English: St. Mary's Cathedral) is a Roman Catholic cathedral in St. Georg. The present building dates from the 1890s.

== Education ==
The main campus of the Hamburg University of Applied Sciences is at the street Berliner Tor.

There were 3 elementary schools and 6 secondary schools in St. Georg in 2006.

== Culture ==
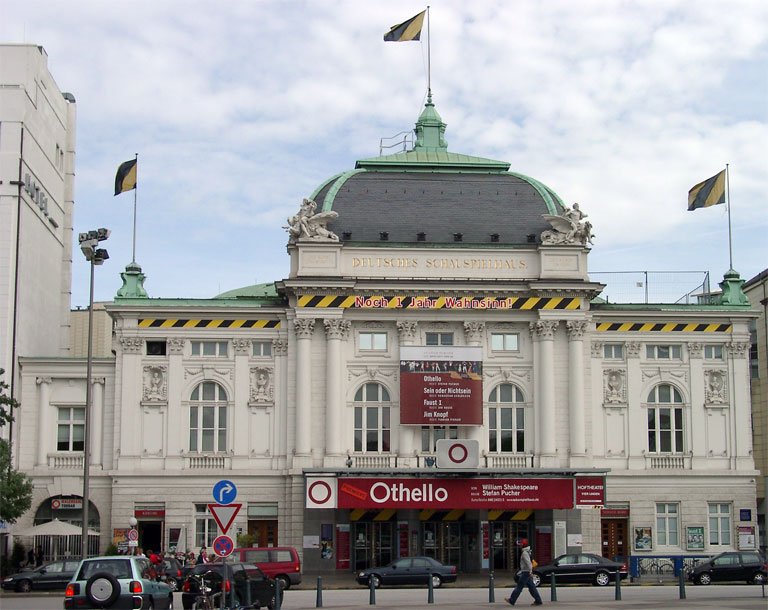
Deutsches Schauspielhaus

The Deutsches Schauspielhaus (theatre), founded in 1901, is located in St. Georg. In 2011 the Ohnsorg-Theater moved into the new theatre in the Bieberhaus next to the Hauptbahnhof. Among others the Sportverein St. Georg von 1895 is a sports club in St. Georg using the facilities in the quarter.

== Infrastructure ==
The Honorary Consulate General of the Kingdom of Thailand established in Hamburg in 1881 is located in the street An der Alster 45 and covers affairs in the states of Bremen, Hamburg, and Schleswig-Holstein.

=== Health systems ===
The Asklepios Klinik St. Georg is a general hospital with 758 beds and 67 day-care places (e.g. for patients with AIDS). The hospital has 10 departments, including internal medicine, surgery (including urology), neurology, neurosurgery, anaesthetics and intensive care and ambulant surgery. The hospital is specialized among others for heart surgery and oncology. It also provides the capacity to dispatch emergency medical services. The hospital is located Lohmühlenstrasse.

Since 2008 the hospital also houses the Asklepios Medical School, a private medical school run by the Asklepios Kliniken Hamburg and the Hungarian Semmelweis University.

In 2006 there were 67 physicians in private practice and 9 pharmacies.

=== Transportation ===
St. Georg is serviced by the rapid transit system of the city train and the underground railway with the Lohmühlenstraße station and the Berliner Tor station. Public transport is also provided by buses.

Hamburg's central railway station is located in St. Georg, also the central bus station, for long distance buses to many cities in Europe.

According to the Department of Motor Vehicles (Kraftfahrt-Bundesamt), in St. Georg were 2,134 private cars registered (205 cars/1000 people).

== Notes ==
=== References ===
- Statistical office Nord of Hamburg and Schleswig-Holstein, official website Statistisches Amt für Hamburg und Schleswig-Holstein (in German)
- Hospitals in Hamburg 2006, Government Agency for Social Affairs, Family Affairs, Health and Environment of Hamburg website (in German)
- D. Boedecker, Die Entwicklung der Hamburgischen Hospitäler seit Gründung der Stadt bis 1800 aus ärztlicher Sicht, Hamburg 1977 (in German)
  Found also: JS 34 in Das virtuelle Hamburgische Urkundenbuch website Virtual Hamburg contract book (in German)
