= Horn, Hamburg =

Horn
- Quarter of Hamburg
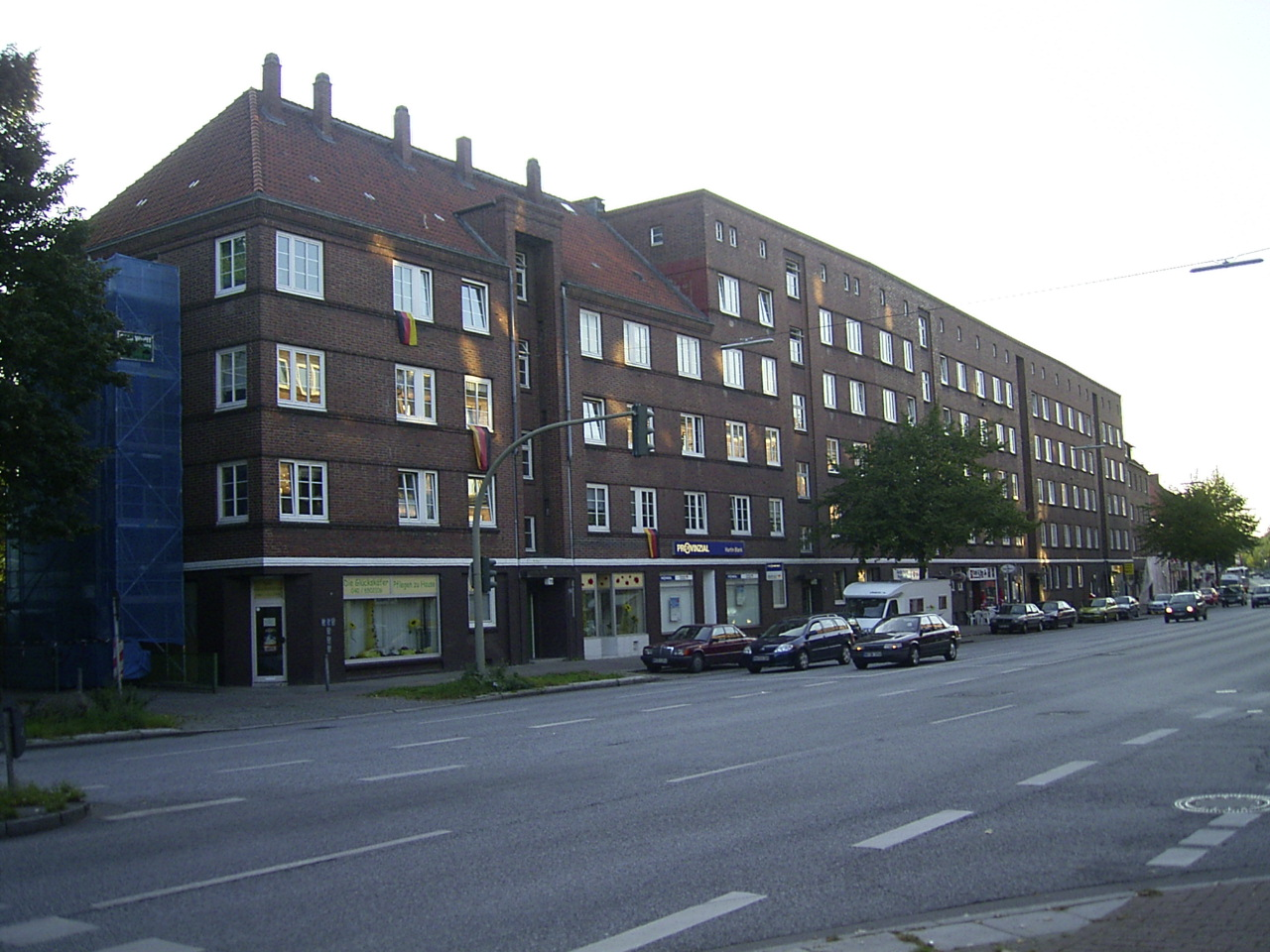
- Brick-buildings at the street Horner Landstraße in 2006.

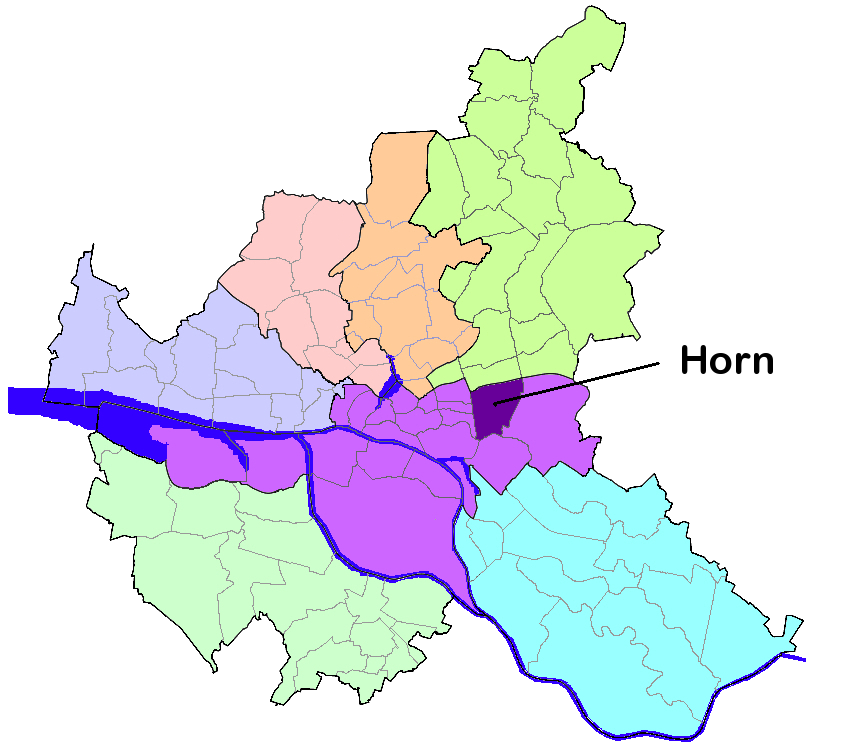
- Location of Horn in Hamburg
- Interactive map of Horn
- Location within Germany Location within Hamburg
- Coordinates: 53°33′N 10°5′E
- Country: Germany
- State: Hamburg
- City: Hamburg
- Borough: Hamburg-Mitte

Area
  - Total: 5.9 km^{2} (2.3 sq mi)

Population (2024-12-31)
  - Total: 39,186
  - Density: 6,600/km^{2} (17,000/sq mi)
- Time zone: UTC+01:00 (CET)
  - Summer (DST): UTC+02:00 (CEST)
- Dialling codes: 040
- Vehicle registration: HH

Horn (German pronunciation: [hɔʁn]) is a district in the borough Hamburg-Mitte, in the eastern part of Hamburg, Germany. In 2020, the population was 37,903.

== History ==
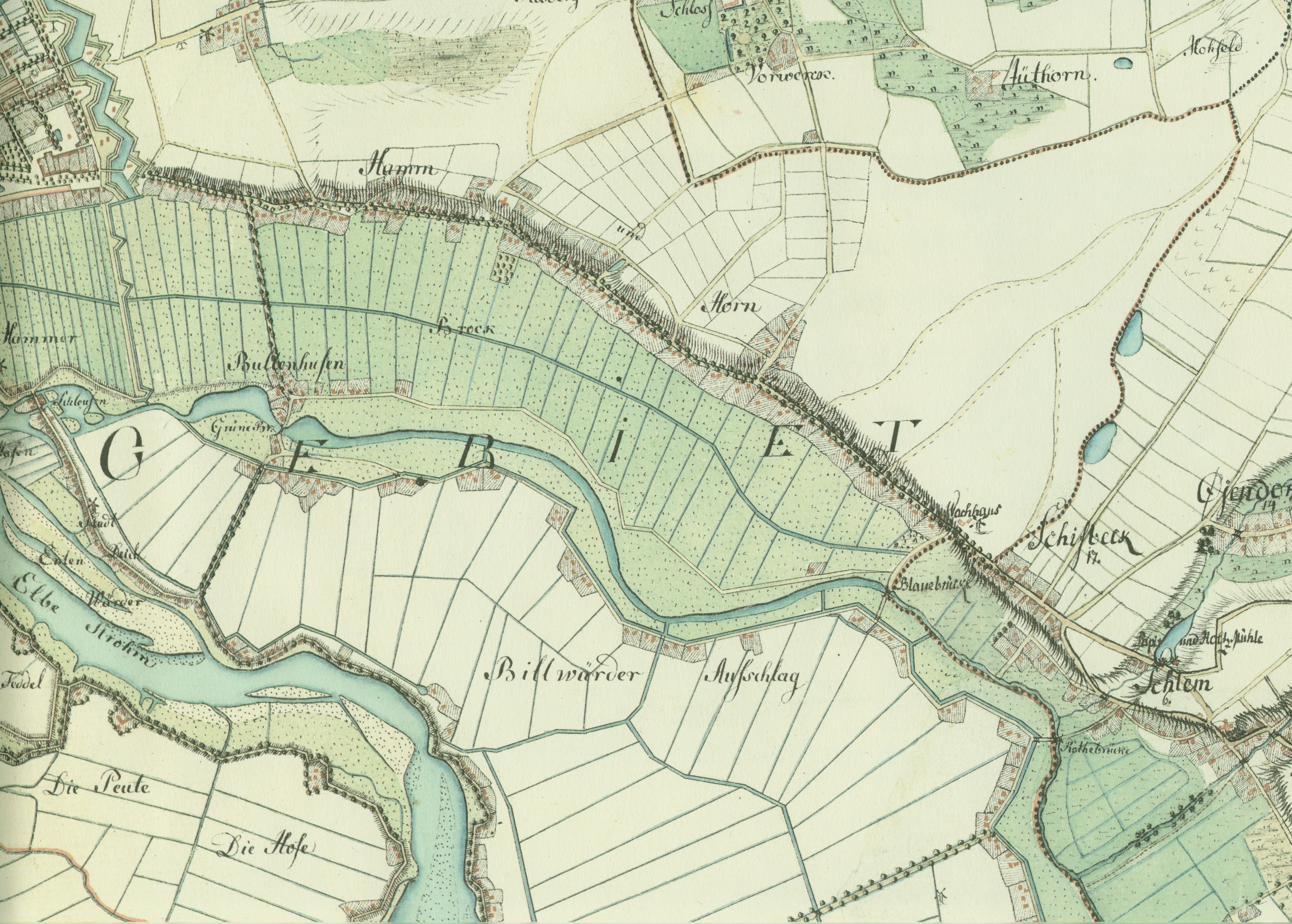
Horn in a military map of the 18th century.

During World War II Hamburg and, therefore, Horn were targets of the air raids of the so-called Operation Gomorrah.

== Geography ==
Horn is located in the eastern part of the city of Hamburg and belongs to the Hamburg-Mitte borough. In 2006 according to the statistical office of Hamburg and Schleswig-Holstein, the quarter had a total area of 5.9 km^{2} (2.3 sq mi). To the north you will find the district of Marienthal, part of the Wandsbek borough, and the district of Billstedt is located to the east. To the west are the districts of Hamm-Nord, Hamm-Mitte and Hamm-Süd; to the south is the district of Billbrook.

== Demographics ==
In 2007 the population of the Horn quarter was 36,890. The population density was 6,273 inhabitants per square kilometre (16,247/sq mi). 15.5% were children under the age of 18, and 17.9% were 65 years of age or older. 22.5% were immigrants. 2,765 people were registered as unemployed. In 1999 there were 19.604 households, and 51% of all households were made up of individuals. The average household size was 1.82.

In 2007 there were 4,237 criminal offences (115/1000 people).

Population by year

1987	1988	1989	1990	1991	1992	1993	1994	1995	1996	1997	1998	1999
37,139	37,216	37,588	38,502	39,047	39,237	39,115	38,597	38,021	37,817	37,344	36,402	35,881

2000	2001	2002	2003	2004	2005	2006	2007
35,522	35,350	35,910	35,971	36,291	36,302	36,490	36,890

== Politics ==
These are the results of Horn in the Hamburg state election:

Election	SPD	Greens	Left	AfD	CDU	FDP	Others
2020	44,0 %	16,8 %	11,2 %	9,1 %	7,6 %	3,2 %	8,1 %
2015	53,0 %	7,5 %	9,8 %	8,8 %	12,2 %	3,9 %	4,8 %
2011	55,2 %	6,4 %	8,0 %	–	18,3 %	4,4 %	7,7 %
2008	42,0 %	4,7 %	8,2 %	–	37,1 %	3,6 %	4,1 %
2004	37,1 %	5,7 %	–	–	43,3 %	2,5 %	11,4 %
2001	41,3 %	3,9 %	0,5 %	–	22,0 %	2,9 %	29,4 %
1997	44,4 %	8,1 %	0,5 %	–	23,9 %	2,2 %	22,9 %
1993	50,7 %	8,0 %	–	–	19,3 %	2,5 %	19,5 %

== Education ==
In 2006 there were 5 elementary schools and 5 secondary schools in Horn totalling 3,894 pupils.

== Sport ==
The Deutsches Derby is a Group 1 flat horse race at the Hamburg-Horn Racecourse, the Horner Rennbahn, scheduled to take place each year in July.

== Infrastructure ==
=== Health systems ===
In 2007 there were 16 day-care centers for children, 44 physicians in private practices and 8 pharmacies.

=== Transportation ===
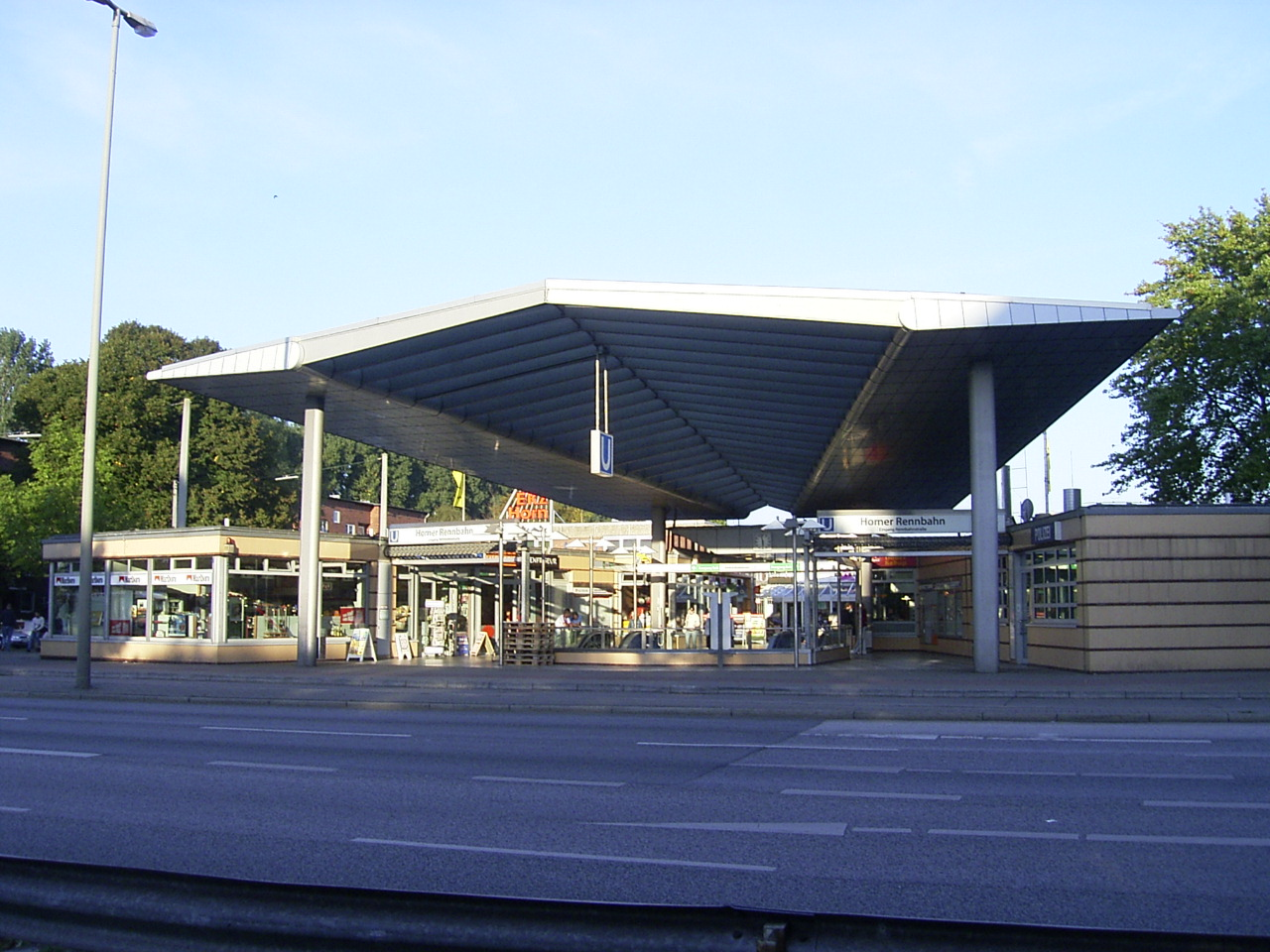
View of the entrance of the Hamburg U-Bahn station Horner Rennbahn in 2006.

Horn is serviced by the rapid transit system of the underground railway with the stations: Horner Rennbahn and Legienstraße (line U2 since the Change of the Lines). According to the Department of Motor Vehicles (Kraftfahrt-Bundesamt), there were 9,310 private cars registered (252 cars/1000 people) in Horn in 2007 with 131 traffic accidents being recorded.

== Notes ==
=== References ===
- Statistical office Hamburg and Schleswig-Holstein Statistisches Amt für Hamburg und Schleswig-Holstein, official website (in German)
