= Third Tschentscher senate =

State government of Hamburg city-state in Germany from 2025 to present

Third Senate of Peter Tschentscher Senate Tschentscher III
- 31st Senate of Hamburg
- 7 May 2025 – present
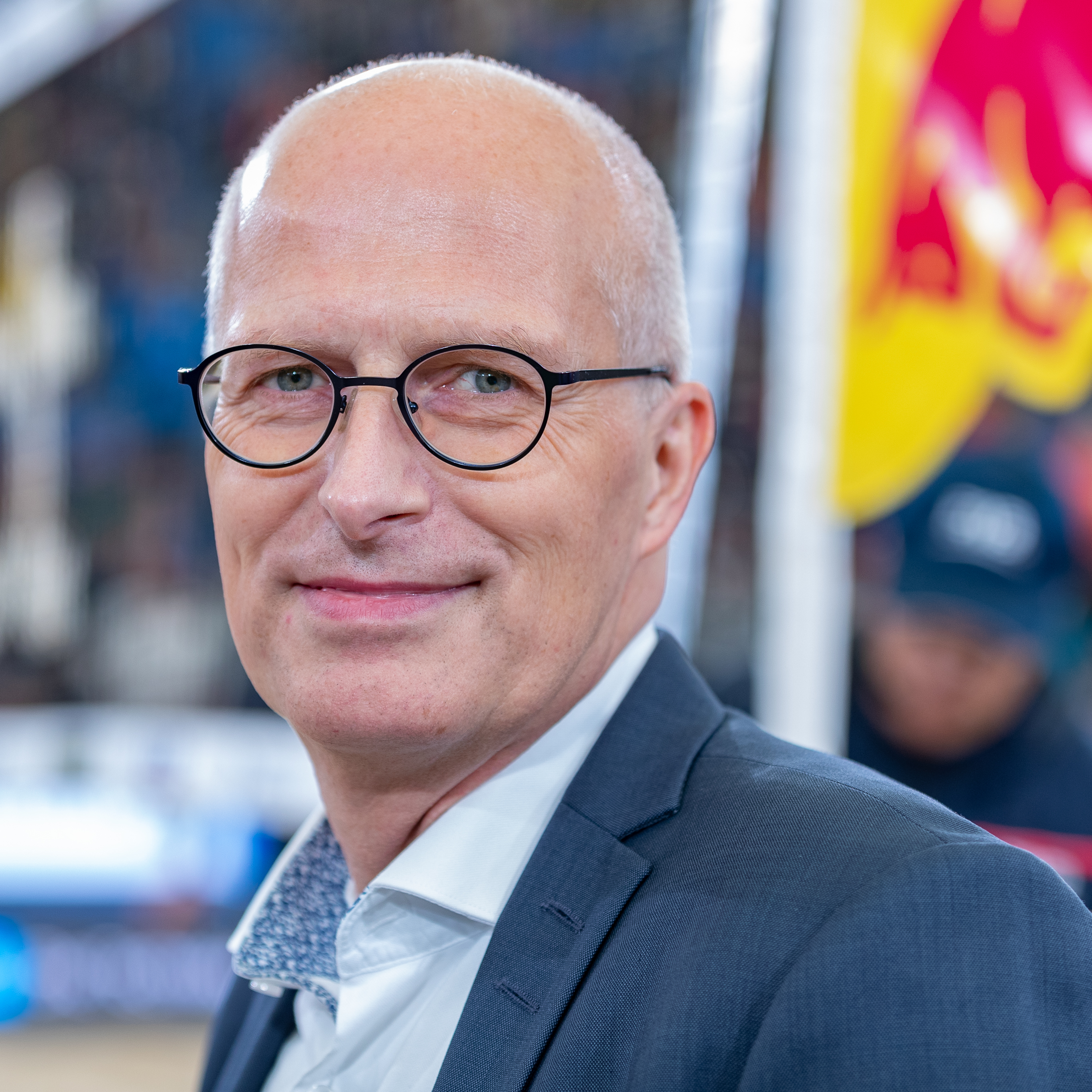
- Peter Tschentscher at the 2019 Beach Volleyball World Championships in Hamburg
- Date formed: 7 May 2025

People and organisations
- First Mayor: Peter Tschentscher
- Second Mayor: Katharina Fegebank
- No. of ministers: 11
- Member parties: Social Democratic Party; Alliance 90/The Greens
- Status in legislature: Majority (Coalition)
- Opposition parties: Christian Democratic Union; The Left; Alternative for Germany

History
- Election: 2025 Hamburg state election
- Legislature term: 23rd Hamburg Parliament
- Predecessor: Second Tschentscher senate

The red-green Senate Tschentscher III has been the state government in Hamburg since the re-election of Peter Tschentscher as First Mayor on 7 May 2025. It was formed as a result of the state election on 2 March 2025. Peter Tschentscher was elected in the Hamburg Parliament on 7 May 2025. He received 71 of 119 votes. The four Green senators were introduced on 28 April 2025, while the seven Senate members nominated by the SPD were announced earlier.

== Senate ==
Senate Tschentscher III – since 7 May 2025
Office	Image	Name	Party	State Councillors	Party
President of the Senate and first mayor Senate Chancellery		Peter Tschentscher	SPD	Liv Assmann; Plenipotentiary to the Federal Government, the European Union and for Foreign Affairs	SPD
President of the Senate and first mayor Senate Chancellery		Peter Tschentscher	SPD	Jan Pörksen; Head of the Senate Chancellery and the Personnel Office	SPD
Second mayor Environment, Climate, Energy, and Agriculture		Katharina Fegebank	B’90/Grüne		
Justice and Consumer Protection		Anna Gallina	B’90/Grüne		
Education and Vocational Training		Ksenija Bekeris	SPD		
Culture and Media		Carsten Brosda	SPD		
Health, Social Affairs, Family and Integration		Melanie Schlotzhauer	SPD		
Economic Affairs, Labor and Innovation		Melanie Leonhard	SPD		
Urban Development and Housing		Karen Pein	SPD		
Science, Research and Equality		Maryam Blumenthal	B’90/Grüne		
Transport and Mobility Transition		Anjes Tjarks	B’90/Grüne		
Interior and Sport		Andy Grote	SPD		
Finance and districts		Andreas Dressel	SPD		
