= Second Tschentscher senate =

State government of Hamburg city-state in Germany from 2020 to 2025

Second Senate of Peter Tschentscher Senate Tschentscher II
- 30th Senate of Hamburg
- 10 June 2020 – 7 May 2025
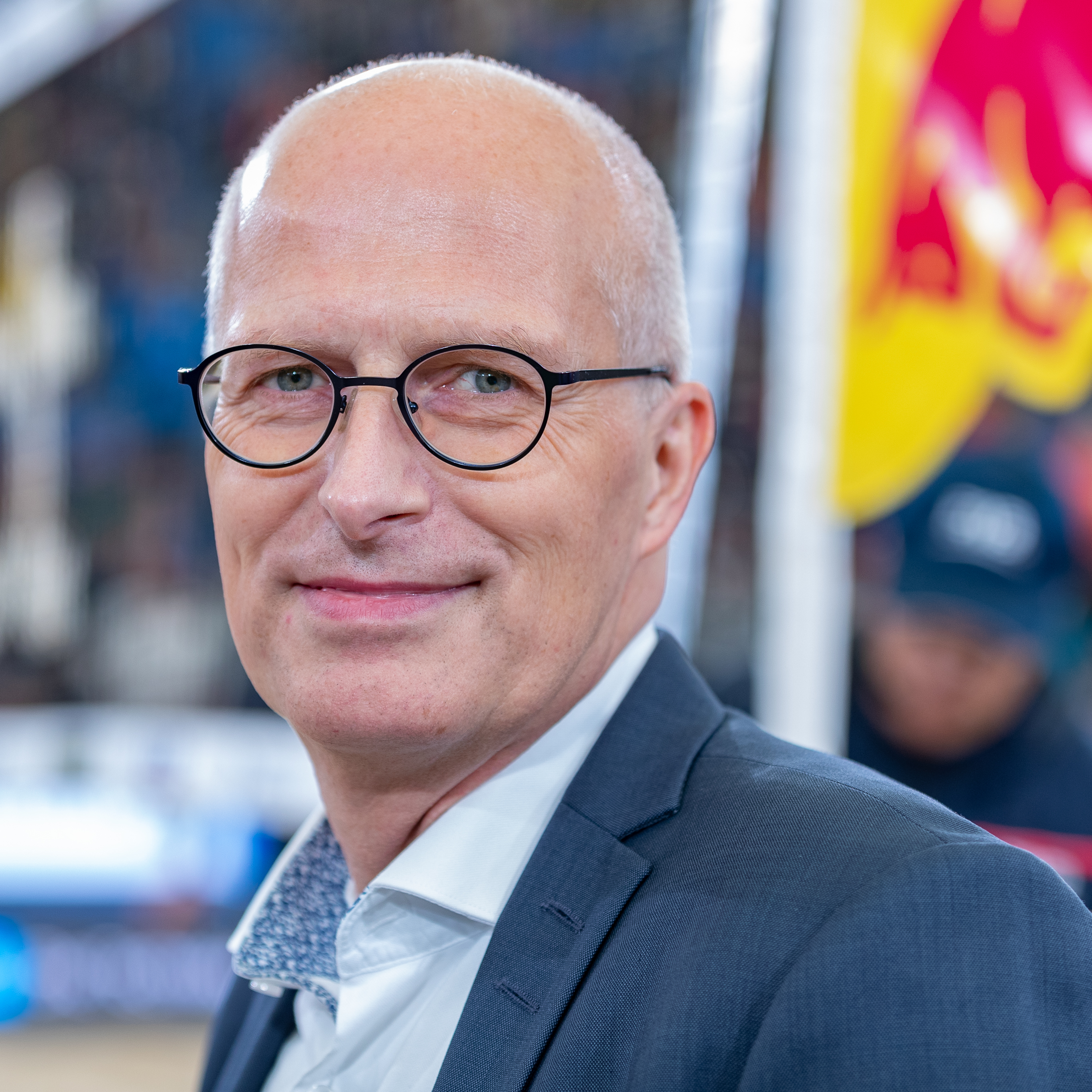
- Peter Tschentscher at the 2019 Beach Volleyball World Championships in Hamburg
- Date formed: 10 June 2020
- Date dissolved: 7 May 2025

People and organisations
- First Mayor: Peter Tschentscher
- Second Mayor: Katharina Fegebank
- No. of ministers: 11
- Member parties: Social Democratic Party; Alliance 90/The Greens
- Status in legislature: Majority (Coalition)
- Opposition parties: Christian Democratic Union; The Left; Alternative for Germany; Free Democratic Party

History
- Election: 2020 Hamburg state election
- Legislature term: 22nd Hamburg Parliament
- Predecessor: First Tschentscher senate
- Successor: Third Tschentscher senate

The second Tschentscher senate was the state government of Hamburg from 10 June 2020 to 7 May 2025. Sworn in on 10 June 2020 after Peter Tschentscher was elected as first mayor by the members of the Hamburg Parliament. On 7 May 2025 Peter Tschentscher was reelected first mayor of Hamburg, forming the Third Tschentscher senate. It was the 30th Senate of Hamburg.

It was formed after the 2020 Hamburg state election by the Social Democratic Party (SPD) and Alliance 90/The Greens (GRÜNE). Excluding the first mayor, the senate comprised 11 ministers, called Senators. Six were members of the SPD, four were members of the Greens, and one was an independent politician.

== Formation ==
The previous senate was a coalition government of the SPD and Greens led by First Mayor Peter Tschentscher.

The election took place on 23 February 2020, and resulted in losses for the SPD, while the Greens doubled their vote share and improved from third to second place. The opposition CDU recorded its worst ever result at 11%, while the Left remained steady on 9%. The AfD slipped to 5% and the FDP narrowly fell below the 5% electoral threshold, retaining only a single seat from a direct constituency.

First Mayor Tchentscher described discussions with the Greens as their "first priority", but said he was open to other possibilities; the Greens called for a renewal of the incumbent government. Post-election, the SPD held exploratory talks with both the Greens and CDU.

On 10 March, the SPD voted to begin coalition negotiations with the Greens. Discussions were interrupted by the COVID-19 pandemic, and postponed until resuming on 23 April. The two parties presented their coalition agreement on 2 June. It was approved by both the SPD and Greens congresses on 6 June.

Peter Tschentscher was elected as First Mayor by the Parliament on 10 June, winning 87 votes out of 123 cast.

== Composition ==
Portfolio	Senator	Party	Took office	Left office	State secretaries
President of the Senate and first mayor Senate Chancellery	Peter Tschentscher born 20 January 1966 (age 60)	SPD	10 June 2020	7 May 2025	Almut Möller (European and International Affairs, Representative to the Federal Government); Jan Pörksen (Head of the Senate Chancellery and Personnel Office)
Second mayor Office for Science, Research, Equality and Boroughs	Katharina Fegebank born 27 February 1977 (age 49)	GRÜNE	10 June 2020	7 May 2025	Eva Gümbel (Science, Research and Equality); Alexander von Vogel (Boroughs)
Office for Justice and Consumer Protection	Anna Gallina born 22 June 1983 (age 42)	GRÜNE	10 June 2020	7 May 2025	Holger Schatz
Office for Education and Vocational Training	Ties Rabe born 14 November 1960 (age 65)	SPD	10 June 2020	7 May 2025	Rainer Schulz
Office for Culture and Media	Carsten Brosda born 3 October 1974 (age 51)	SPD	10 June 2020	7 May 2025	Jana Schiedek
Office for Labour, Health, Social Affairs, Family and Integration	Melanie Leonhard born 14 July 1977 (age 48)	SPD	10 June 2020	7 May 2025	Petra Lotzkat (Labour, Social Affairs, Family and Integration); Melanie Schlotzhauer (Health)
Office for Economics and Innovation	Michael Westhagemann born 9 August 1957 (age 68)	Ind.	10 June 2020	7 May 2025	Andreas Rieckhof
Office for Urban Development and Housing	Dorothee Stapelfeldt born 12 August 1956 (age 69)	SPD	10 June 2020	7 May 2025	Monika Thomas
Office for Environment, Climate, Energy and Agricultural Economics	Jens Kerstan born 18 February 1966 (age 60)	GRÜNE	10 June 2020	7 May 2025	Michael Pollmann
Office for Transport and the Mobility Turnaround	Anjes Tjarks born 12 March 1981 (age 44)	GRÜNE	10 June 2020	7 May 2025	Martin Bill
Office for Interior and Sport	Andy Grote born 14 June 1968 (age 57)	SPD	10 June 2020	7 May 2025	Bernd Krösser (Interior); Christoph Holstein (Sport)
Office for Finance	Andreas Dressel born 6 January 1975 (age 51)	SPD	10 June 2020	7 May 2025	Bettina Lentz
