= 2025 Hamburg state election =

Election in Germany

- 2 March 2025

All 121 seats in the Hamburg Parliament 61 seats needed for a majority
- Turnout: 4,366,018 (67.7%) ▲4.5%
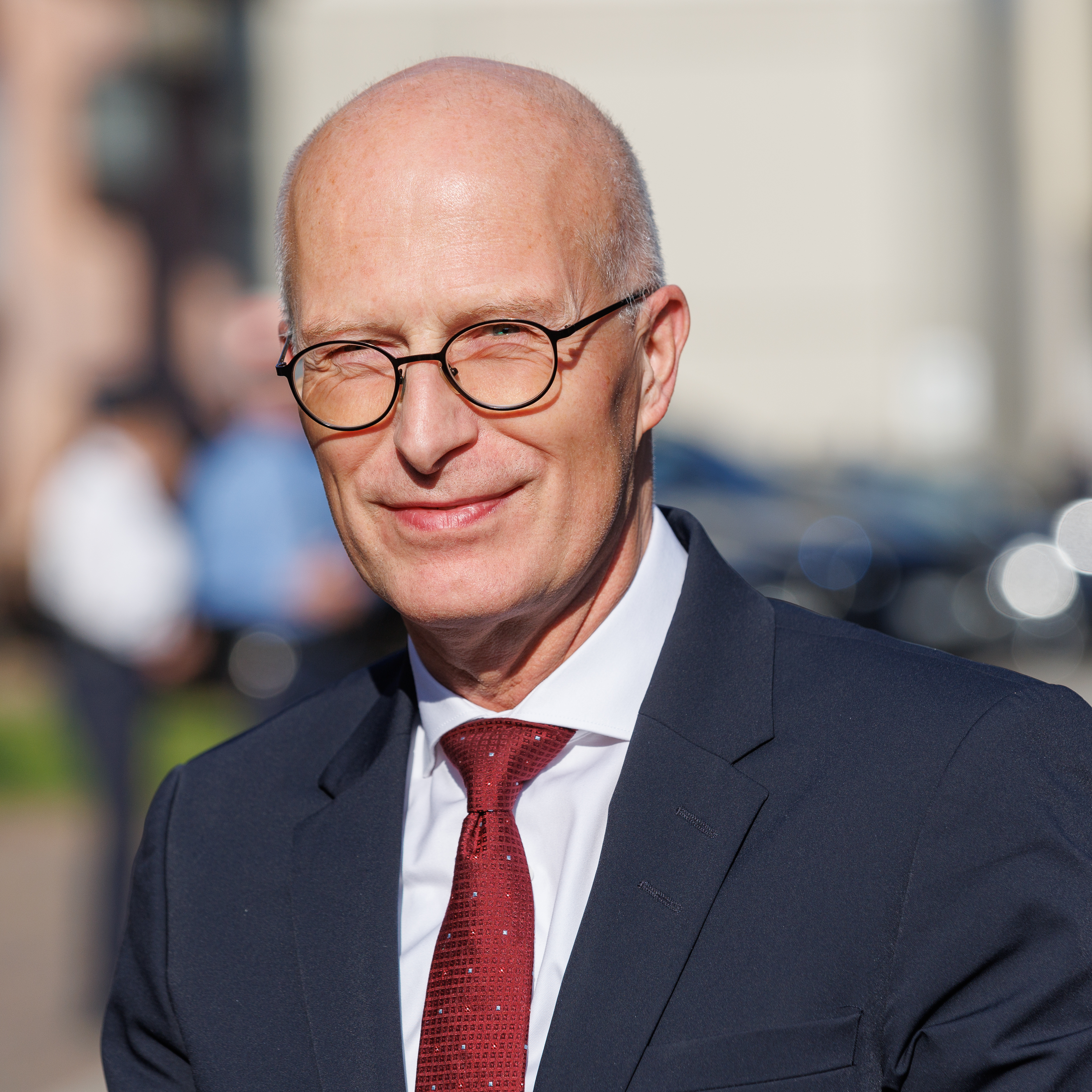

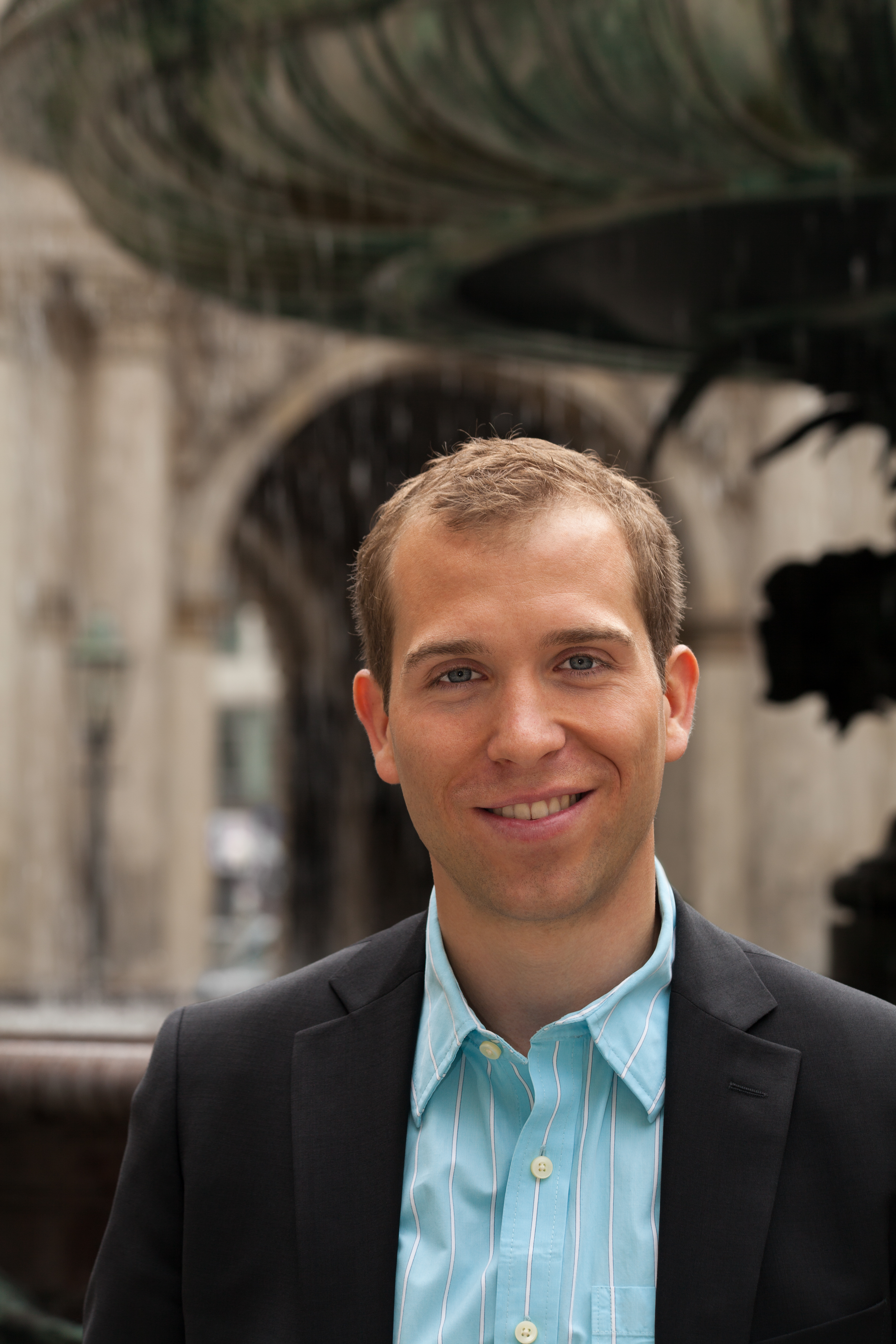

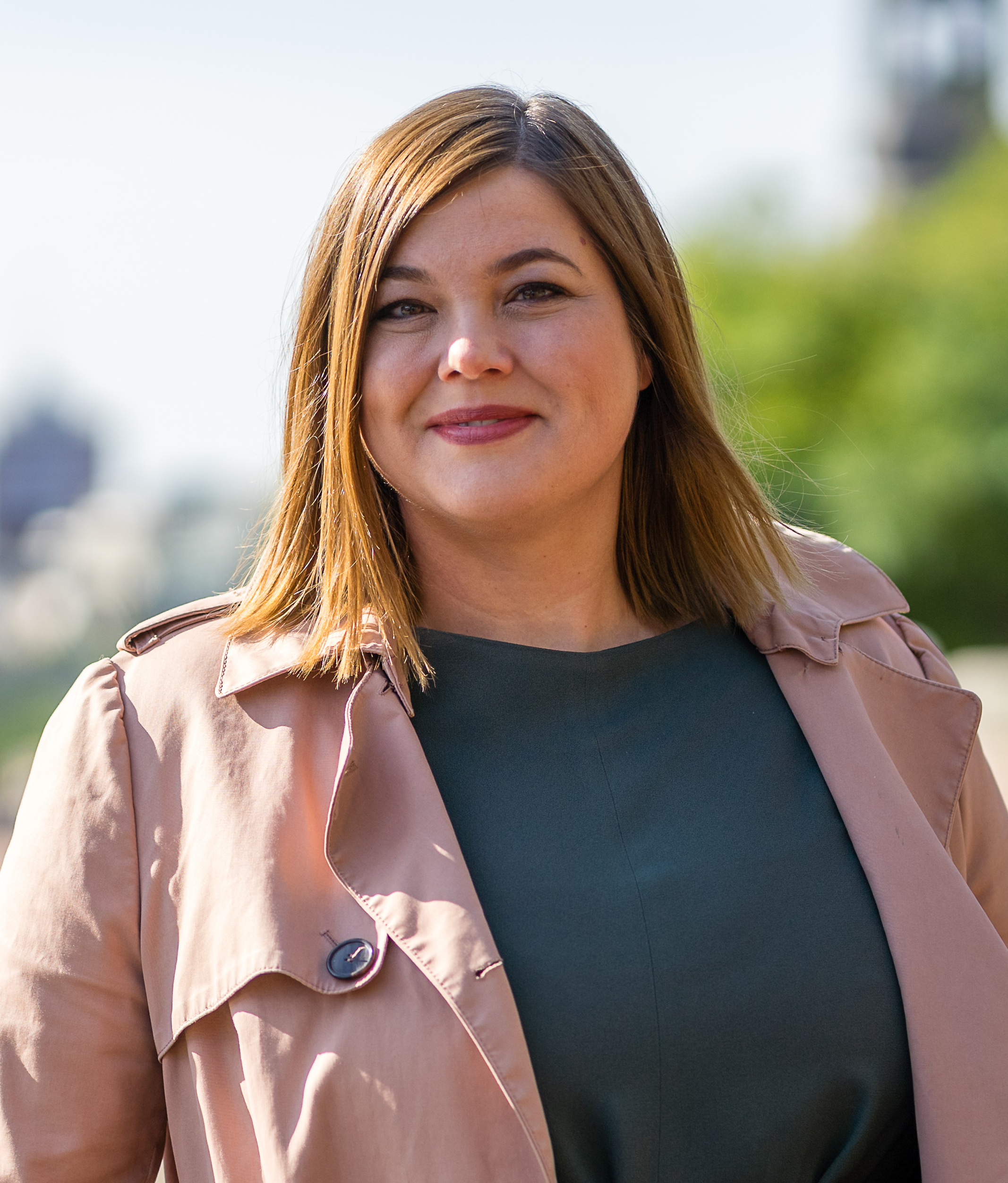

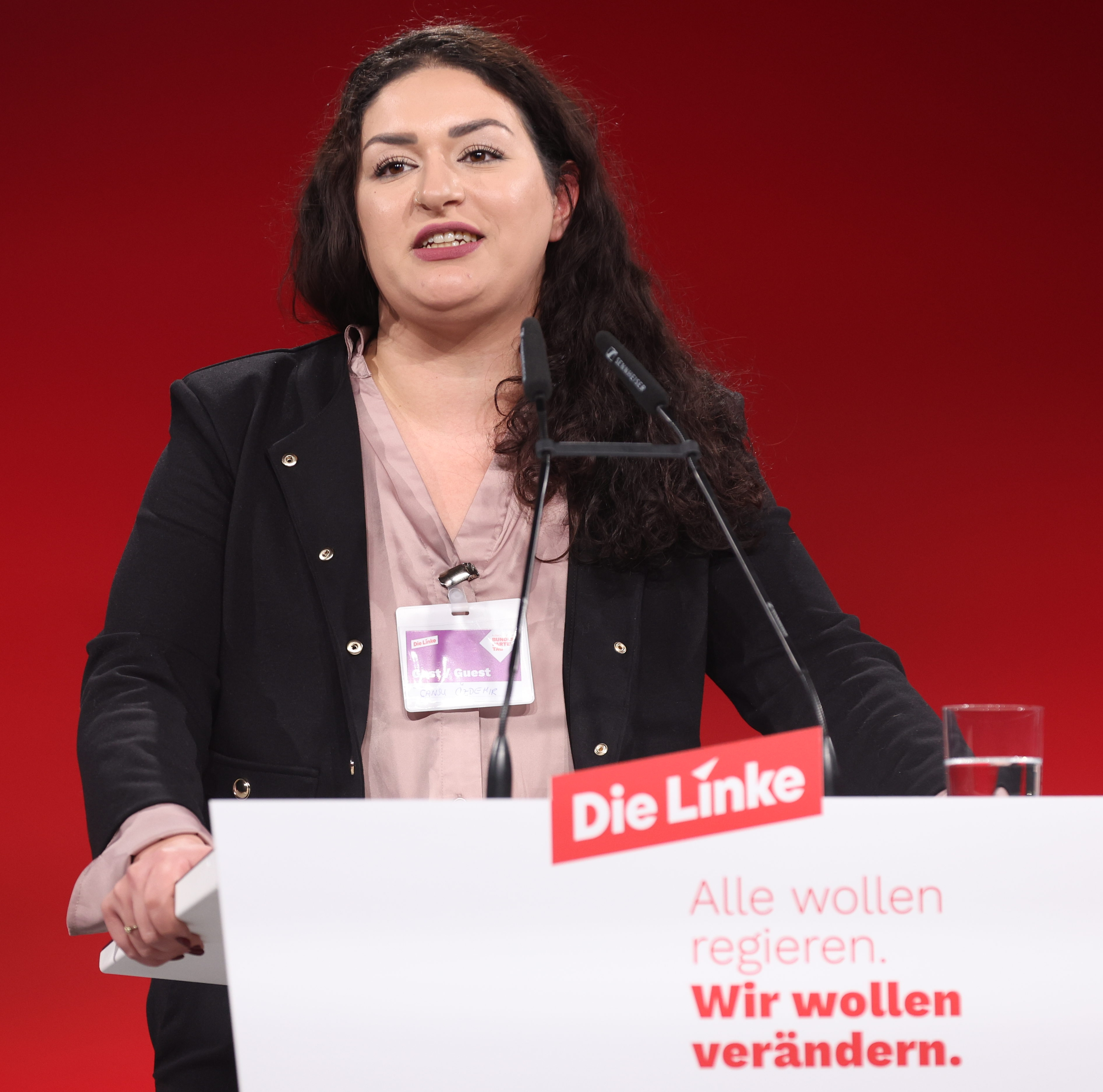

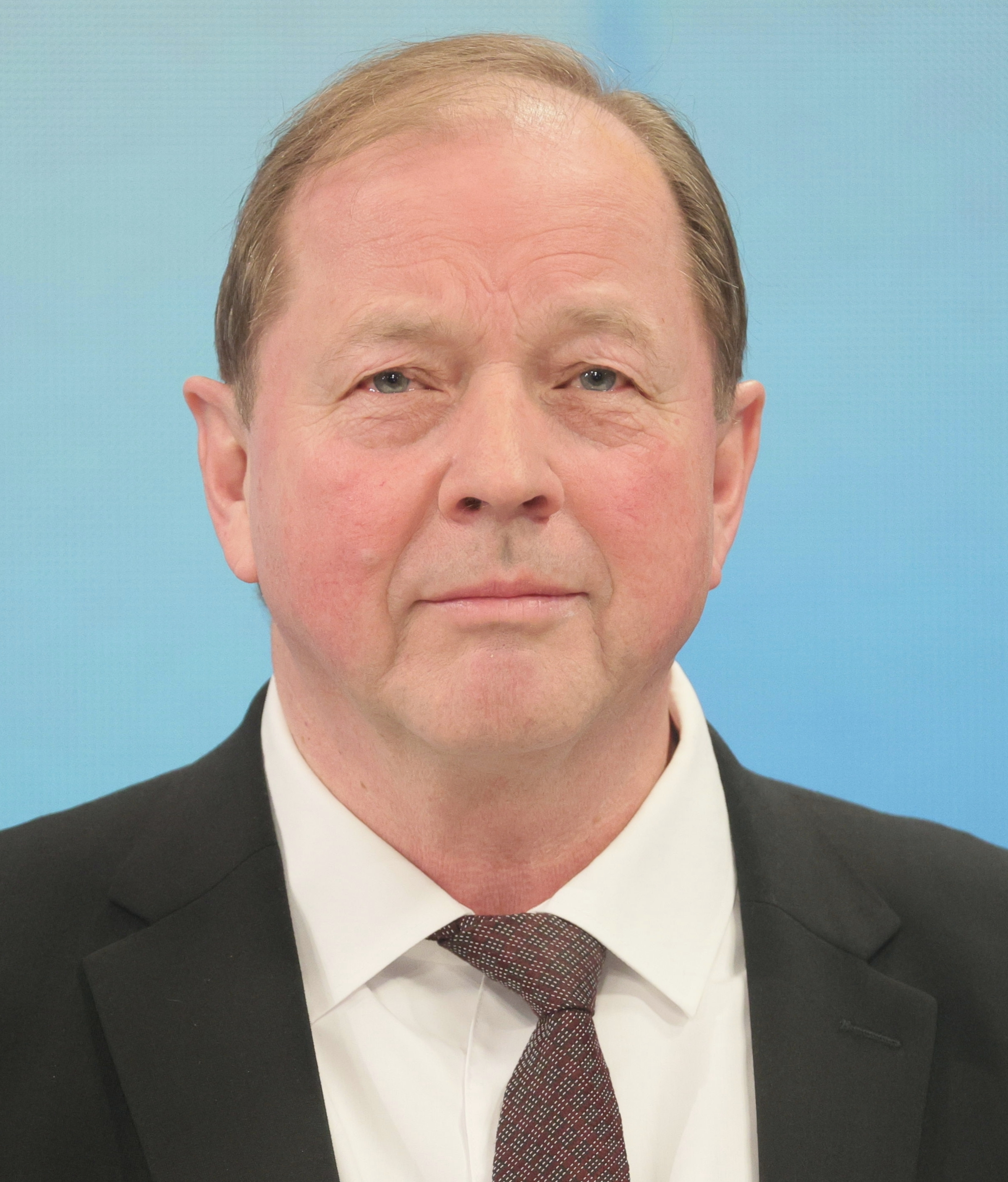
| | First party | Second party | Third party |
|---|---|---|---|
| Candidate | Peter Tschentscher | Dennis Thering | Katharina Fegebank |
| Party | SPD | CDU | Greens |
| Last election | 54 seats, 39.2% | 15 seats, 11.2% | 33 seats, 24.2% |
| Seats won | 45 | 26 | 25 |
| Seat change | ▼9 | ▲11 | ▼8 |
| Popular vote | 1,463,560 | 864,700 | 805,783 |
| Percentage | 33.5% | 19.8% | 18.5% |
| Swing | ▼5.7 pp | ▲8.6 pp | ▼5.7 pp |
| | Fourth party | Fifth party | Sixth party |
| | | | FDP |
| Candidate | Cansu Özdemir | Dirk Nockemann | Katarina Blume |
| Party | Left | AfD | FDP |
| Last election | 13 seats, 9.1% | 7 seats, 5.3% | 1 seat, 4.9% |
| Seats won | 15 | 10 | 0 |
| Seat change | ▲2 | ▲3 | ▼1 |
| Popular vote | 487,729 | 329,066 | 100,522 |
| Percentage | 11.2% | 7.5% | 2.3% |
| Swing | ▲2.1 pp | ▲2.2 pp | ▼2.6 pp |
- Election results by constituency
Government before election
Second Tschentscher senate
SPD–Green
Government after election
Third Tschentscher senate
SPD–Green

The 2025 Hamburg state election was held on 2 March 2025. It was held to elect the members of the 23rd Hamburg Parliament.

== Background ==
In 2020, the SPD came first, losing four seats but coming ahead of the Greens by a large margin. The Greens almost doubled their share of the vote. The CDU achieved its worst ever result in a Hamburg general election, with 11.2 percent, while The Left took 9.1 percent, its best. The AfD just managed to get back in with 5.3 percent of the votes.

The FDP, on the other hand, fell just short of the five percent hurdle with 4.96 percent and missed out on entering parliament for the first time since 2008. However, because of a direct mandate from its top candidate, Anna-Elisabeth von Treuenfels-Frowein, in the Blankenese constituency, the FDP was represented by a non-attached member of parliament. Another member, Sami Musa, joined in January 2022, bringing the number of FDP seats to two, after leaving the SPD in September 2021. The party was reduced to a single seat when von Treuenfels-Frowein defected to the CDU in 2024. Metin Kaya, who was elected for The Left, joined the new Sahra Wagenknecht Alliance (BSW) in November 2023.

The Second Tschentscher senate was formed as a red–green coalition.

=== Electoral system ===
Since 2008 Hamburg elections have been held using an open-list system of proportional representation. The Sainte-Laguë method is used to distributed seats. Each voter has ten votes: Five votes can be cast for local constituency candidates and five for candidates on each party's state list. The state is divided into 17 constituencies of 3-5 seats. 71 representatives are elected in these based on the result of the constituency vote. A further 50 seats are elected as state list seat, based on the number of state list votes received by each party, distributed in such a way that the distribution of all 121 is proportional to the state list vote. Only parties receiving more than 5% of the state list votes are eligible to receive state list seats; there is no legal threshold for constituency seats.

If a party receiving less than 5% of the vote wins one or more constituency seats, the size of the legislature is increased beyond 121 members. A further seat is added if necessary, to ensure that the total number of members is odd.

== Opinion polls ==
=== Party polling ===
| Polling firm | Fieldwork date | Sample size | SPD | Grüne | CDU | Linke | AfD | FDP | Volt | BSW | Others | Lead |
|---|---|---|---|---|---|---|---|---|---|---|---|---|
| 2025 state election | 2 Mar 2025 | – | 33.5 | 18.5 | 19.8 | 11.2 | 7.5 | 2.3 | 3.2 | 1.8 | 2.1 | 13.7 |
| Forschungsgruppe Wahlen | 26–27 Feb 2025 | 1,046 | 33 | 17 | 18 | 12 | 9 | – | 3 | – | 8 | 15 |
| INSA | 24–26 Feb 2025 | 1,000 | 32 | 16 | 17 | 13 | 11 | 3 | – | 3 | 5 | 15 |
| Federal election | 23 Feb 2025 | – | 22.7 | 19.3 | 20.7 | 14.4 | 10.9 | 4.5 | 1.5 | 4.0 | 1.9 | 2.0 |
| Infratest dimap | 17–19 Feb 2025 | 1,308 | 32 | 18 | 17 | 10 | 10 | 3 | 3 | 3 | 4 | 14 |
| Forschungsgruppe Wahlen | 10–13 Feb 2025 | 1,055 | 32 | 19 | 18 | 9 | 9 | 3 | 3 | 3 | 4 | 13 |
| Infratest dimap | 29 Jan – 3 Feb 2025 | 1,164 | 31 | 20 | 18 | 8 | 9 | 3 | – | 3 | 8 | 11 |
| Trend Research Hamburg | 16–20 Jan 2025 | 890 | 34 | 20 | 16 | 6 | 11 | 3 | 3 | 3 | 4 | 14 |
| Infratest dimap | 9–13 Jan 2025 | 1,159 | 31 | 22 | 17 | 5 | 9 | 4 | – | 4 | 8 | 9 |
| Trend Research Hamburg | 5–10 Dec 2024 | 886 | 32 | 20 | 17 | 7 | 10 | 4 | 3 | 3 | 4 | 12 |
| Infratest dimap | 20–25 Nov 2024 | 1,177 | 30 | 21 | 19 | 6 | 9 | 3 | 3 | 4 | 4 | 9 |
| Forsa | 24–28 Oct 2024 | 1,017 | 30 | 21 | 21 | 5 | 8 | 4 | – | 4 | 7 | 11 |
| EP election | 9 Jun 2024 | – | 18.8 | 21.1 | 18.5 | 5.1 | 8.0 | 7.0 | 5.9 | 4.9 | 10.6 | 2.3 |
| Wahlkreisprognose | 15–25 Apr 2024 | 1,304 | 32 | 21.5 | 18 | 6 | 8.5 | 3.5 | – | 2 | 8.5 | 10.5 |
| Infratest dimap | 1–5 Feb 2024 | 1,164 | 30 | 21 | 20 | 7 | 9 | 5 | – | – | 8 | 9 |
| Trend Research Hamburg | 17–24 Oct 2023 | 1,068 | 31 | 19 | 18 | 10 | 14 | 4 | – | – | 4 | 12 |
| Wahlkreisprognose | 24 Sep–2 Oct 2023 | 1,000 | 24.5 | 21.5 | 21 | 8.5 | 13 | 3 | – | – | 8.5 | 3 |
| Civey | 26 Sep–24 Oct 2022 | 1,000 | 29 | 30 | 20 | 5 | 5 | 4 | – | – | 7.0 | 1 |
| Wahlkreisprognose | 9–16 Sep 2022 | 950 | 32 | 27 | 15 | 8 | 7 | 6 | – | – | 5 | 5 |
| Wahlkreisprognose | 24–29 Jan 2022 | 1,000 | 40 | 26.5 | 10 | 6 | 5 | 7 | – | – | 5.5 | 13.5 |
| 2021 federal election | 26 Sep 2021 | – | 29.7 | 24.9 | 15.4 | 6.7 | 5.0 | 11.4 | 0.5 | – | 6.4 | 4.8 |
| pmg – policy matters | 2–11 Jun 2020 | 1,020 | 37 | 23 | 13 | 10 | 6 | 5 | – | – | 4 | 14 |
| 2020 state election | 23 Feb 2020 | – | 39.2 | 24.2 | 11.2 | 9.1 | 5.3 | 4.9 | 1.3 | – | 6.1 | 15.0 |

=== First mayor polling ===
| Polling firm | Fieldwork date | Sample size | | | | Lead |
| Polling firm | Fieldwork date | Sample size | Tschentscher SPD | Fegebank Greens | Thering CDU | Lead |
|---|---|---|---|---|---|---|
| Forschungsgruppe Wahlen | 25–27 Feb 2025 | 1,250 | 51 | 14 | 15 | 36 |
| Infratest dimap | 17–19 Feb 2025 | 1,308 | 49 | 16 | 16 | 33 |
| Forschungsgruppe Wahlen | 10–13 Feb 2025 | 1,055 | 52 | 17 | 12 | 35 |
| Infratest dimap | 27 Jan – 3 Feb 2025 | 1,164 | 44 | 16 | 15 | 28 |
| Infratest dimap | 9–13 Jan 2025 | 1,159 | 44 | 16 | 16 | 28 |
| Infratest dimap | 20–25 Nov 2024 | 1,177 | 46 | 15 | 12 | 31 |

== Results ==
The incumbent red-green coalition won 70 of 121 seats and thus retained its majority. Tschentscher stated he would begin discussions over renewing the coalition as soon as possible. He also intends to talk to the CDU in view of that party's improved result, but called a grand coalition his "second choice".

The third Tschentscher senate was inaugurated on 7 May.

=== Overall results ===
| Party | Constituency list | | | Statewide list | | | Total seats | +/– |
| Party | Votes | % | Seats | Votes | % | Seats | Total seats | +/– |
|---|---|---|---|---|---|---|---|---|
| Social Democratic Party | 1,329,237 | 30.75 | 27 | 1,463,560 | 33.52 | 18 | 45 | ▼9 |
| Christian Democratic Union | 946,795 | 21.90 | 18 | 864,700 | 19.81 | 8 | 26 | ▲11 |
| Alliance 90/The Greens | 836,341 | 19.35 | 14 | 805,783 | 18.46 | 11 | 25 | ▼8 |
| The Left | 559,745 | 12.95 | 9 | 487,729 | 11.17 | 6 | 15 | ▲2 |
| Alternative for Germany | 293,520 | 6.79 | 3 | 329,066 | 7.54 | 7 | 10 | ▲3 |
| Volt Germany | 188,396 | 4.36 | 0 | 141,490 | 3.24 | 0 | 0 | 0 |
| Free Democratic Party | 129,541 | 3.00 | 0 | 100,522 | 2.30 | 0 | 0 | ▼1 |
| Sahra Wagenknecht Alliance | | | | 76,922 | 1.76 | 0 | 0 | New |
| Democratic Alliance for Diversity and Awakening | 13,605 | 0.31 | 0 | 25,250 | 0.58 | 0 | 0 | 0 |
| Human Environment Animal Protection Party | | | | 24,723 | 0.57 | 0 | 0 | 0 |
| Die PARTEI | | | | 15,620 | 0.36 | 0 | 0 | 0 |
| Free Voters | 11,695 | 0.27 | 0 | 12,197 | 0.28 | 0 | 0 | 0 |
| The Vote – For Peace and Social Justice | 9,850 | 0.23 | 0 | 7,251 | 0.17 | 0 | 0 | 0 |
| Ecological Democratic Party | | | | 6,571 | 0.15 | 0 | 0 | 0 |
| Alliance Germany | | | | 2,956 | 0.07 | 0 | 0 | 0 |
| National Democratic Party of Germany (Note: Legally unrelated party to The Homeland. The Hamburg state chapter of The Homeland left the party in June 2023 in protest of its rebranding from the National Democratic Party, and subsequently formed a new party under the former name.) | | | | 1,678 | 0.04 | 0 | 0 | 0 |
| Independents (Note: Süleyman Cevik, Lukas Thiele, Bérangère Bultheel) | 4,178 | 0.10 | 0 | | | | 0 | 0 |
| The German Conservatives | 126 | 0.00 | 0 | | | | 0 | New |
| Total | 4,323,029 | 100.00 | 71 | 4,366,018 | 100.00 | 50 | 121 | – |
| Valid votes | 4,323,029 | 99.69 | | 4,366,018 | 99.61 | | | |
| Invalid/blank votes | 13,401 | 0.31 | | 16,947 | 0.39 | | | |
| Total votes | 4,336,430 | 100.00 | | 4,382,965 | 100.00 | | | |
| Registered voters/turnout | | 67.7 | | | 67.7 | | | |

=== Electorate ===
The electorate statistics, based on exit-poll surveys, are as follows:

| Demographic | SPD | Grüne | CDU | Linke | AfD | FDP | Volt | BSW | Other |
|---|---|---|---|---|---|---|---|---|---|
| Total vote | 33.5% | 18.5% | 19.8% | 11.2% | 7.5% | 2.3% | 3.2% | 1.8% | 2.2% |
Sex
| Men | 32% | 17% | 22% | 10% | 9% | 3% | 4% | 2% | 1% |
| Women | 35% | 20% | 18% | 12% | 6% | 2% | 3% | 2% | 2% |
Age
| 16–24 years old | 27% | 16% | 11% | 25% | 6% | 4% | 4% | 2% | 5% |
| 25–34 years old | 25% | 25% | 11% | 20% | 6% | 3% | 6% | 2% | 2% |
| 35–44 years old | 28% | 24% | 16% | 12% | 8% | 2% | 6% | 2% | 2% |
| 45–59 years old | 34% | 19% | 24% | 6% | 9% | 2% | 2% | 2% | 2% |
| 60–69 years old | 41% | 14% | 24% | 6% | 8% | 2% | 1% | 2% | 2% |
| 70 and older | 47% | 9% | 29% | 5% | 5% | 2% | 1% | 1% | 1% |
Employment status
| Self-employed | 24% | 20% | 26% | 8% | 11% | 3% | 3% | 2% | 3% |
| Employees | 32% | 21% | 18% | 11% | 6% | 2% | 4% | 2% | 4% |
| Workers | 32% | 12% | 18% | 11% | 15% | 2% | 4% | 4% | 2% |
| Pensioners | 47% | 8% | 25% | 6% | 10% | 2% | 1% | 1% | 0% |
Education
| Simple education | 45% | 8% | 25% | 6% | 10% | 2% | 1% | 1% | 0% |
| Medium education | 38% | 9% | 22% | 10% | 12% | 2% | 2% | 2% | 3% |
| High education | 30% | 23% | 19% | 12% | 5% | 3% | 4% | 2% | 2% |
Financial situation
| Good | 35% | 19% | 20% | 10% | 6% | 2% | 3% | 1% | 4% |
| Bad | 24% | 11% | 15% | 21% | 17% | 1% | 3% | 5% | 3% |

== See also ==
- 2025 German federal election
- 2025 Hamburg referendums
