= Hila Latifi =

German politician

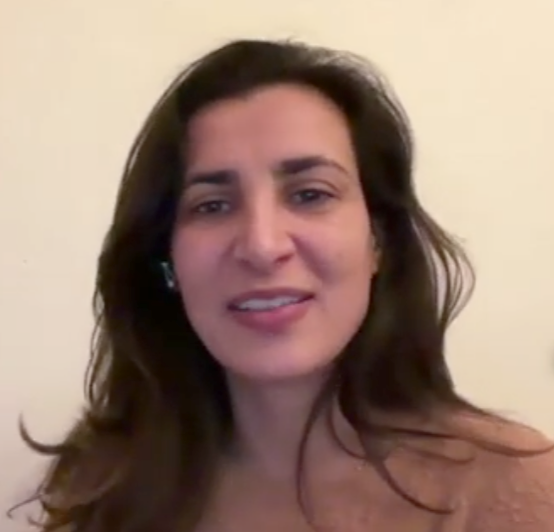
- Latifi in a 2025 interview

Member of the Hamburg Parliament
- Incumbent
- Assumed office 2025
- Constituency: State list

Personal details
- Born: 1989 (age 36–37) Kabul, Afghanistan
- Party: Die Linke
- Occupation: Politician

Anahita Hila Latifi (born 1989) is a German politician serving as a Die Linke member of the Hamburg Parliament since 2025. Prior to her election, she worked as a consultant and family therapist, specializing in refugee families and mental health.

== Biography ==
Hila Latifi was born in 1989 in Kabul, to a wealthy left-wing family who worked for the Democratic Republic of Afghanistan. She claims descent from the Barakzai dynasty through her maternal lineage. Her family fled Afghanistan when she was six after the Taliban seized control of the country, and after an eleven-country journey they eventually arrived in near Bremen. Raised in an area near Hamburg which she described as "predominantly white, rural, and conservative", she and her family felt welcome and did not experience exclusion as she already spoke German upon arrival; she was a class and school representative.

After graduating from Gymnasium Syke, Latifi obtained a BA from HKS Ottersberg, a private, self-paid university, where she studied art in social contexts and art therapy. She subsequently trained as a systemic consultant for couples and families. She worked a Socio-pedagogical family support, for refugee families and gave one talk on refugees and mental health.

Latifi joined Die Linke in 2023 and the party's state executive committee in 2024. She was elected to the Hamburg Parliament in the 2025 Hamburg state election through the party's state list. She is a member of the Committee on Equality and Anti-Discrimination, the Committee on Social Affairs and Integration, and the Education Committee. She is also her parliamentary group's spokesperson for anti-discrimination, diversity, feminism, and integration.

Latifi criticized the German government's handling of the 2021 Kabul airlift for becoming more of "an admission program that looks like humanitarian aid".

Latifi has one child.
