= 2020 Hamburg state election =

State election in Hamburg, Germany

- 23 February 2020

All 123 seats in the Hamburg Parliament 62 seats needed for a majority
- Turnout: 4,054,861 (63.2%) ▲6.7%
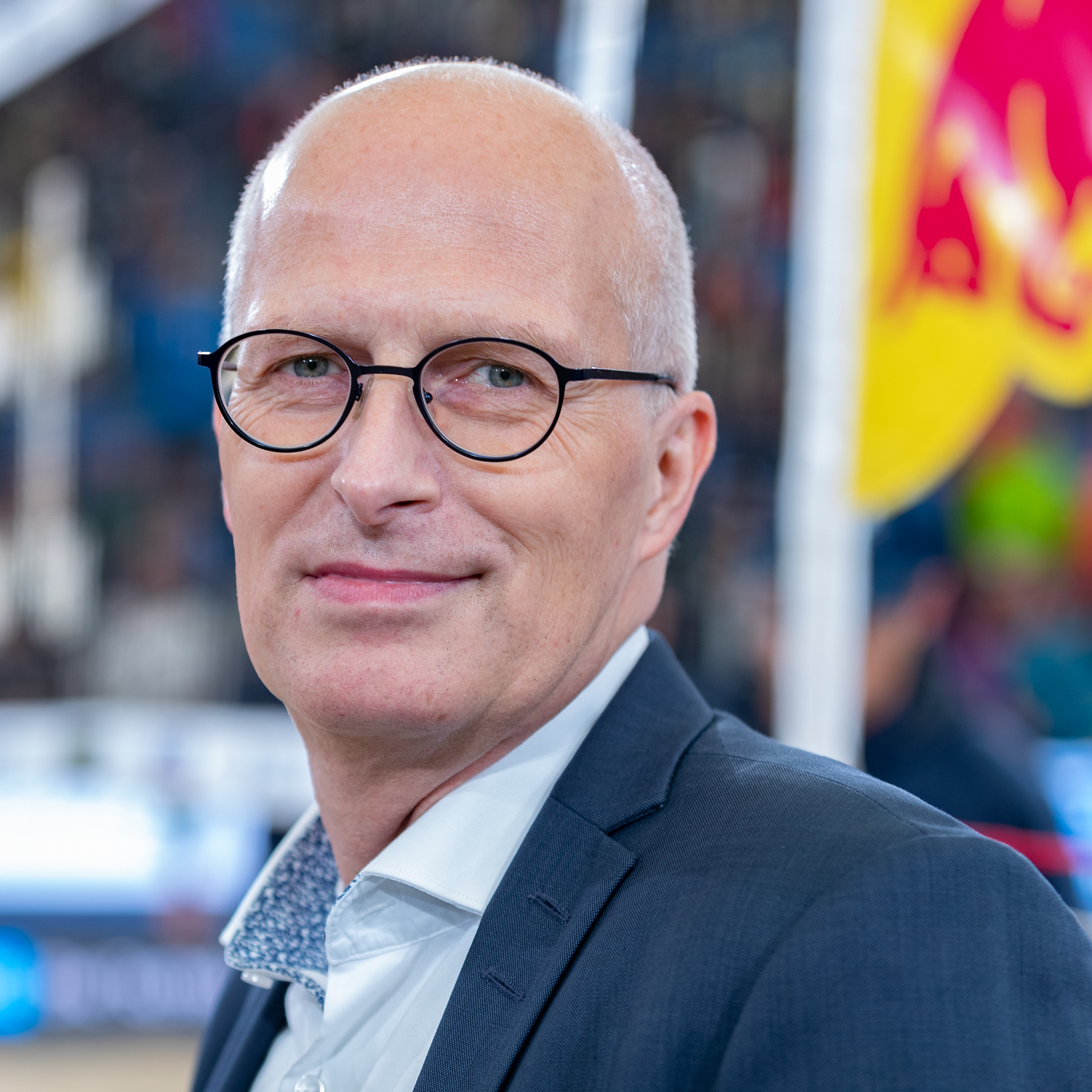

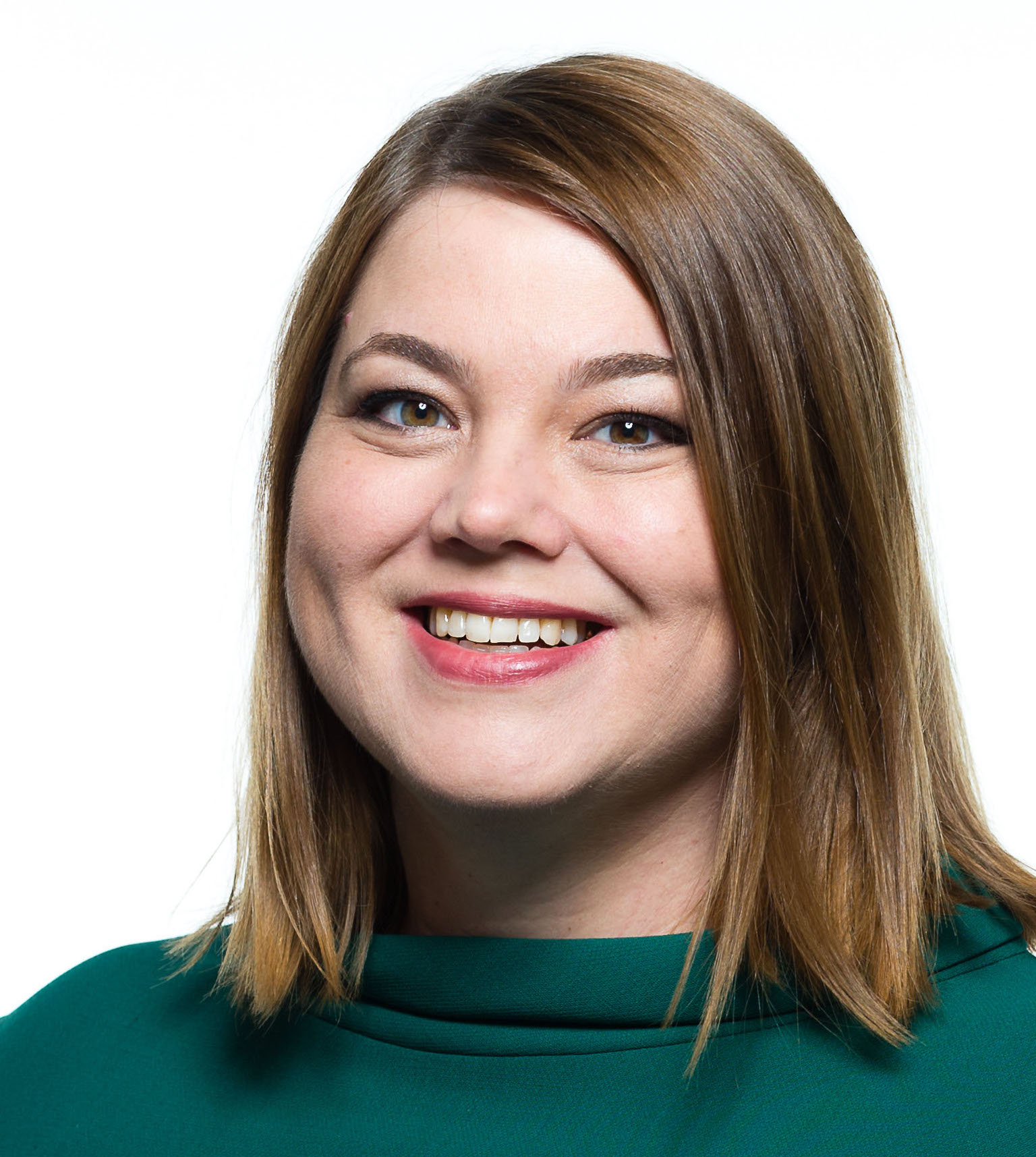

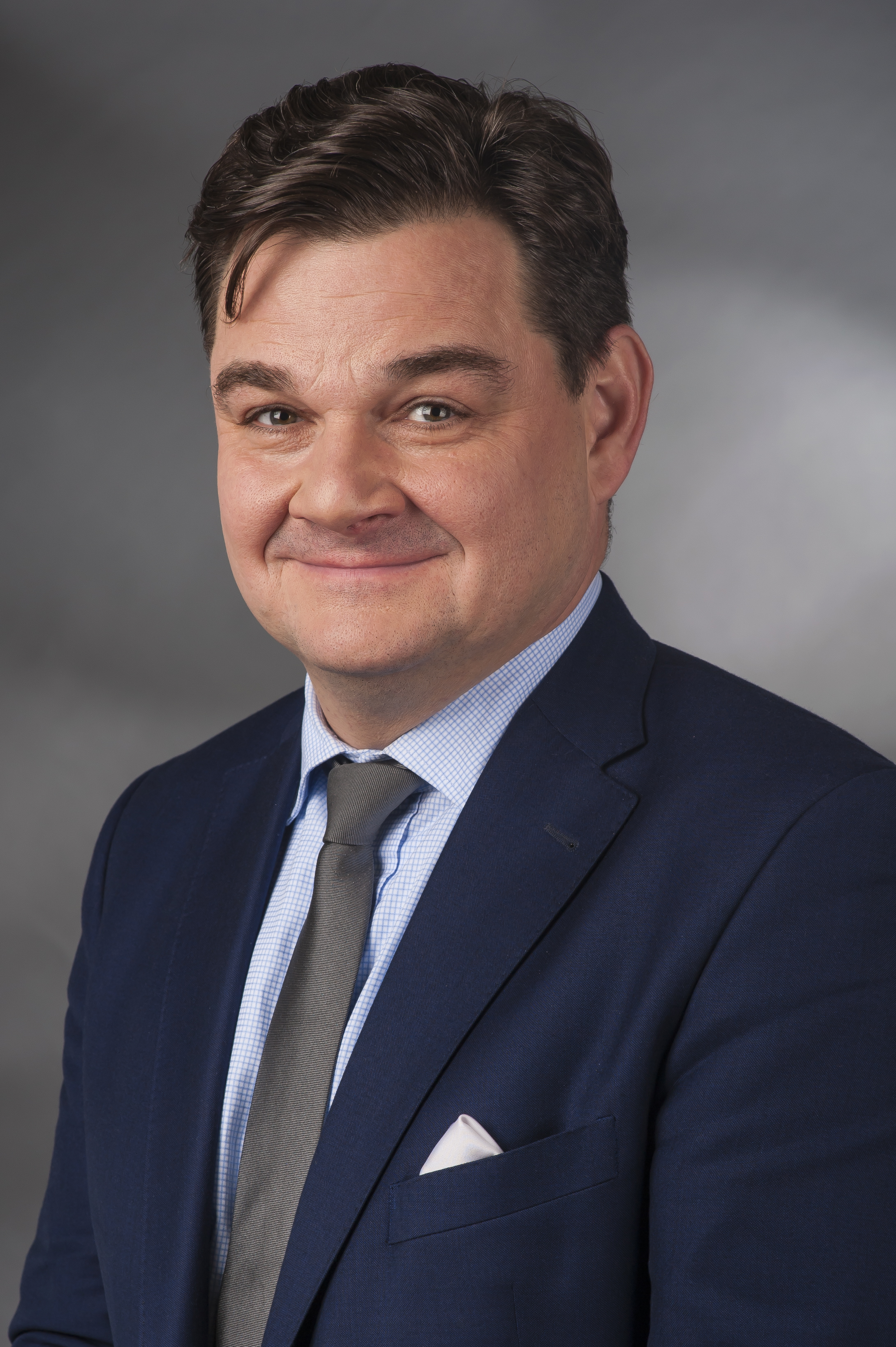

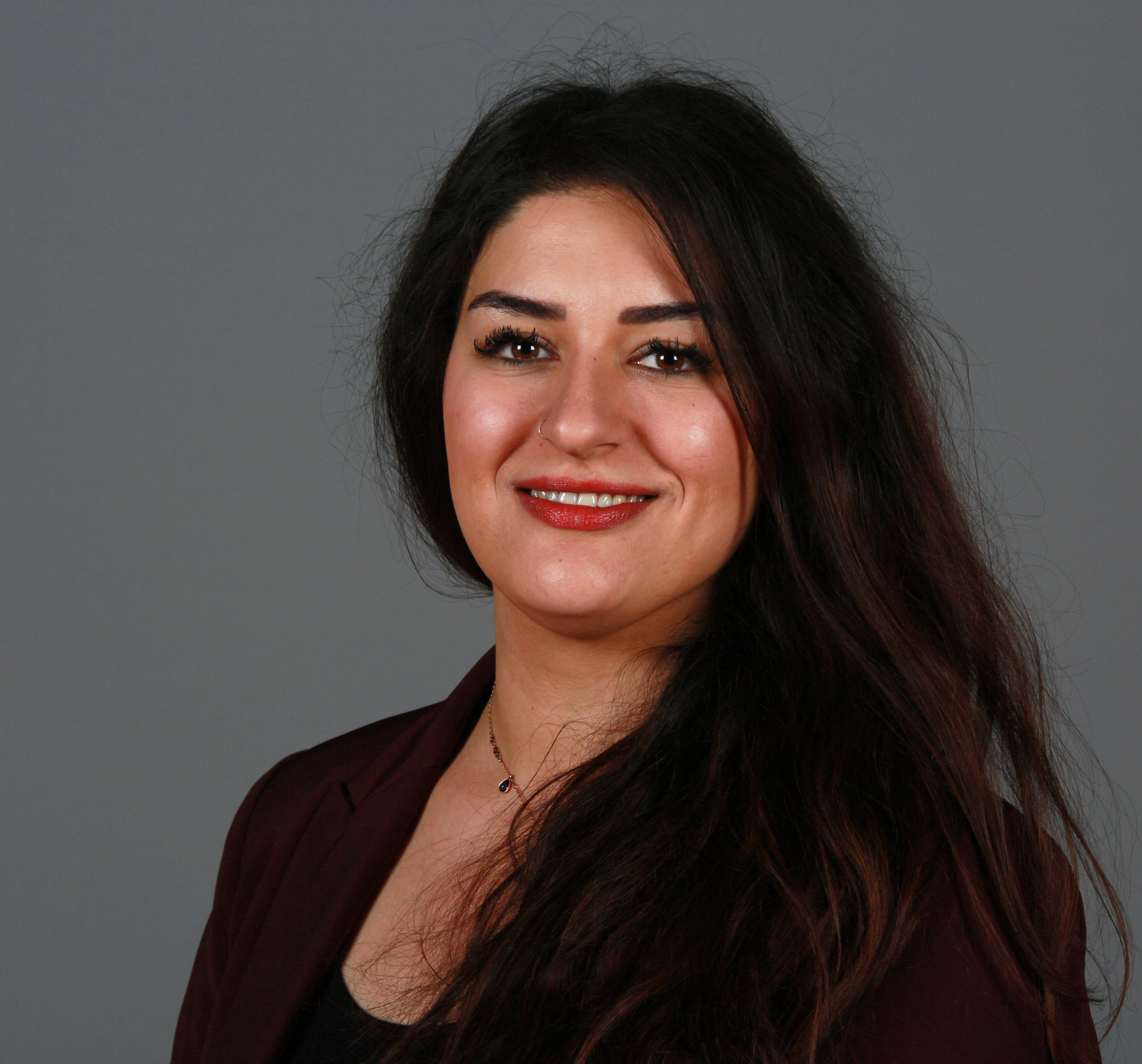

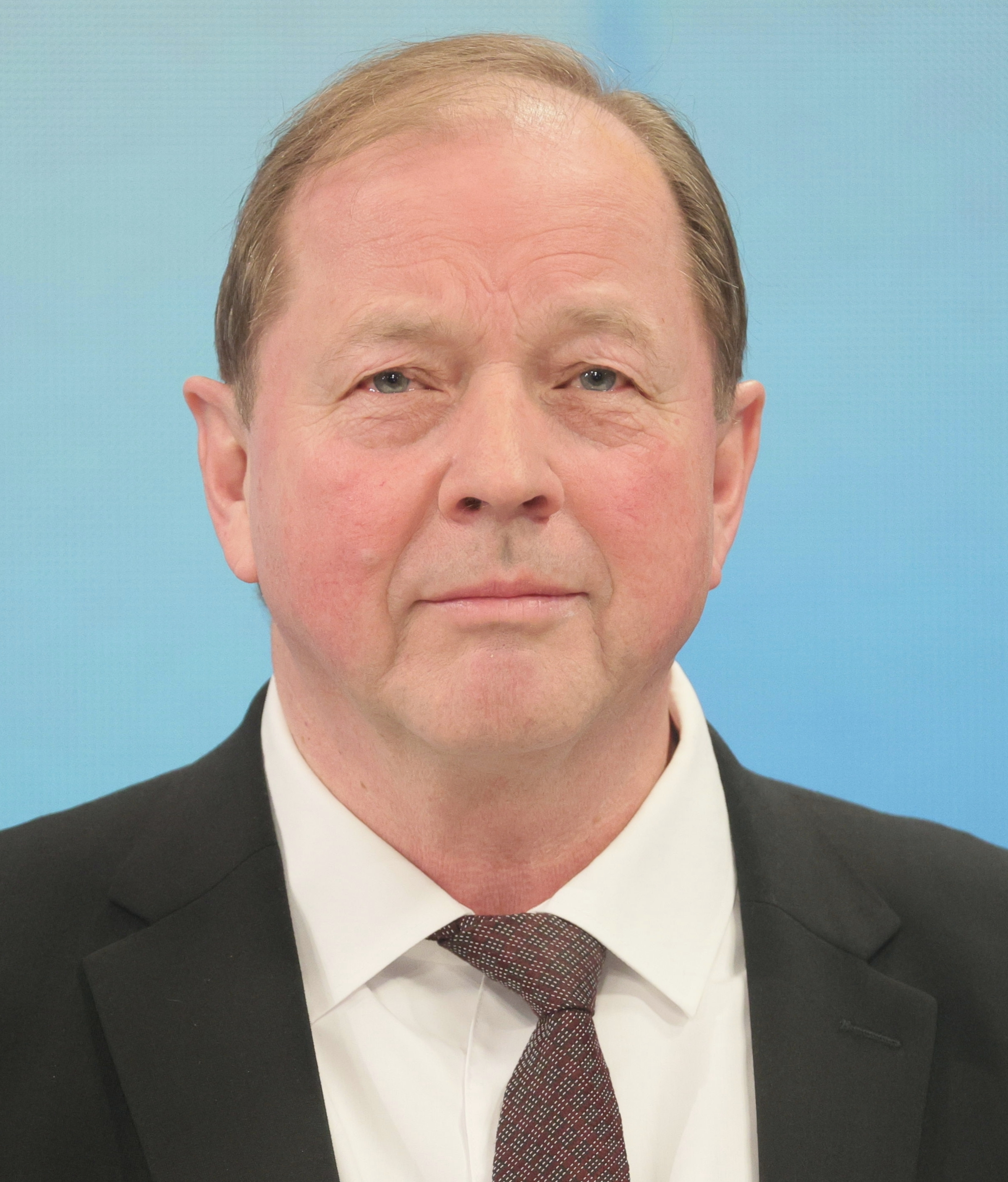

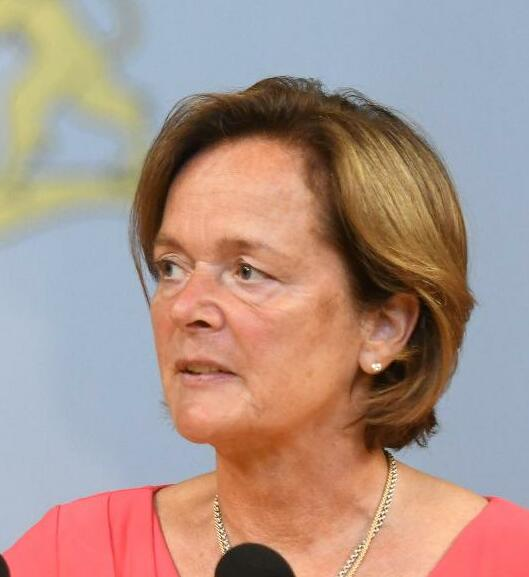
	First party	Second party	Third party
Leader	Peter Tschentscher	Katharina Fegebank	Marcus Weinberg
Party	SPD	Greens	CDU
Last election	58 seats, 45.6%	15 seats, 12.3%	20 seats, 15.9%
Seats won	54	33	15
Seat change	▼4	▲18	▼5
Popular vote	1,591,098	980,361	452,372
Percentage	39.2%	24.2%	11.2%
Swing	▼6.4%	▲11.9%	▼4.7%
	Fourth party	Fifth party	Sixth party
Leader	Cansu Özdemir	Dirk Nockemann	Anna-Elisabeth von Treuenfels-Frowein
Party	Left	AfD	FDP
Last election	11 seats, 8.5%	8 seats, 6.1%	9 seats, 7.4%
Seats won	13	7	1
Seat change	▲2	▼1	▼8
Popular vote	368,471	214,596	201,162
Percentage	9.1%	5.3%	4.9%
Swing	▲0.6%	▼0.8%	▼2.5%
Government before election
First Tschentscher senate
SPD–Green
Government after election
Second Tschentscher senate
SPD–Green

The 2020 Hamburg state election was held on 23 February 2020 to elect the members of the 22nd Hamburg Parliament. The outgoing government was a coalition of the Social Democratic Party (SPD) and The Greens led by First Mayor Peter Tschentscher.

Despite losses, the SPD remained comfortably in first place with 39% of votes. The Greens doubled their vote share to 24%, becoming the second largest party in the state Parliament for the first time. The opposition Christian Democratic Union (CDU) suffered their worst ever result in Hamburg, and their worst result in any state election since 1952, falling to third place with 11% of votes. The Left achieved a small upswing and remained in fourth place. The Alternative for Germany (AfD) narrowly cleared the 5% electoral threshold, recording a decline compared to its previous result for the first time in any state or national-level election. The Free Democratic Party lost a third of its vote share and fell narrowly short of the 5% electoral threshold, in total winning only one seat from a direct constituency.

The SPD–Green government was returned with an increased majority of 87 seats, comprising 71% of the Parliament. The coalition was subsequently renewed. Peter Tschentscher was re-elected Mayor on 10 June.

== Issues and campaign ==
=== Federal ===
The Hamburg state election was overshadowed by the Thuringia government crisis, the resignation of Annegret Kramp-Karrenbauer as federal CDU leader, and a terrorist attack targeting immigrants in Hanau which took place four days before the election.

=== Local ===
In the wake of the Thuringia government crisis, approximately 20% of the FDP's election posters in Hamburg were defaced or destroyed. Greens leader Katharina Fegebank stated that such actions "harmed democracy".

== Electoral system ==
The elections were conducted under a list proportional system in the same manner as the prior election. 71 seats were awarded directly in the 17 multi-mandate constituencies (of between 3-5 seats each) via open constituency lists, and the remaining 50 via at-large open state lists (German: landesliste) based on percentage of the overall vote with a 5% electoral threshold.

Each voter had a total of ten votes: five constituency votes for the direct candidates in the constituency, and five at-large votes for candidates on the state lists (or for state lists in their entirety). The five votes could be amassed all on one person, party, or list (accumulation) or could be distributed/split between different candidates, parties, or lists as desired (panachage). Voting privileges were passively awarded, meaning anyone over the age of 16 meeting eligibility requirements was automatically enrolled.

== Parties ==
The table below lists parties represented in the 21st Hamburg Parliament.

Name		Ideology	Leader(s)	2015 result	
Name		Ideology	Leader(s)	Votes (%)	Seats
SPD	Social Democratic Party of Germany; Sozialdemokratische Partei Deutschlands	Social democracy	Peter Tschentscher	45.6%	58 / 121
CDU	Christian Democratic Union of Germany; Christlich Demokratische Union Deutschlands	Christian democracy	Marcus Weinberg	15.9%	20 / 121
Grüne	Alliance 90/The Greens; Bündnis 90/Die Grünen	Green politics	Katharina Fegebank	12.3%	15 / 121
Linke	The Left; Die Linke	Democratic socialism	Cansu Özdemir	8.5%	11 / 121
FDP	Free Democratic Party; Freie Demokratische Partei	Classical liberalism	Anna-Elisabeth von Treuenfels-Frowein	7.4%	9 / 121
AfD	Alternative for Germany; Alternative für Deutschland	German nationalism Right-wing populism	Dirk Nockemann	6.1%	8 / 121

== Opinion polling ==
Graph of opinion polls conducted, trendlines are local regressions (LOESS) CDU SPD AfD Green FDP Left

Polling firm	Fieldwork date	Sample size	SPD	CDU	Grüne	Linke	FDP	AfD	Others	Lead
2020 state election	23 Feb 2020	–	39.2	11.2	24.2	9.1	4.9	5.3	6.1	15.0
Forschungsgruppe Wahlen	19–20 Feb 2020	1,184	39	12	24	8.5	5	6	5.5	15
INSA	12–17 Feb 2020	1,006	38	13	23	8	5	7	6	15
Universität Hamburg	2 Jan–14 Feb 2020	1,004	34	12	32	7	6	5	5	2
Forschungsgruppe Wahlen	11–13 Feb 2020	1,128	37	13	25	8	4.5	7	5.5	12
Infratest dimap	10–12 Feb 2020	1,003	38	14	23	8	5	6	6	15
Infratest dimap	30 Jan–4 Feb 2020	1,000	34	14	27	8	5	7	5	7
Trend Research Hamburg	24–29 Jan 2020	672	33	14	24	10	7	7	5	9
Infratest dimap	16–21 Jan 2020	1,002	32	16	27	8	6	7	4	5
Infratest dimap	2–7 Jan 2020	1,000	29	15	29	9	7	7	4	Tie
Forsa	18 Dec 2019–2 Jan 2020	1,009	29	16	26	10	7	7	5	3
Trend Research Hamburg	27–31 Dec 2019	678	32	13	23	13	8	8	4	9
Civey	22 Nov–20 Dec 2019	2,041	30.4	13.6	24.1	13.7	7.4	7.5	3.3	6.3
Infratest dimap	11–16 Dec 2019	1,004	28	17	26	11	6	7	5	2
Trend Research Hamburg	5–10 Nov 2019	652	32	13	23	12	7	8	4	9
INSA	23 Oct–4 Nov 2019	1,020	25	17	26	12	8	8	4	1
Trend Research Hamburg	6–11 Sep 2019	618	28	14	28	11	6	9	4	Tie
2019 European election	26 May 2019	–	19.8	17.7	31.2	7.0	5.6	6.5	12.2	11.4
pmg – policy matters	6–16 May 2019	1,002	30	16	22	11	9	10	2	8
Universität Hamburg	6 Jan–2 Mar 2019	1,069	35	15	29	9	6	4	3	6
Infratest dimap	18–21 Feb 2019	1,005	31	17	22	10	8	8	4	9
Forsa	27 Dec 2018–3 Jan 2019	1,004	30	14	24	11	9	7	5	6
Forsa	19 Mar–4 Apr 2018	1,001	36	16	18	12	7	7	4	18
pmg – policy matters	23 Feb–2 Mar 2018	1,025	28	22	15	14	8	10	3	6
2017 federal election	24 Sep 2017	–	23.5	27.2	13.9	12.2	10.8	7.8	4.5	3.7
Universität Hamburg	8 Sep–17 Nov 2016	1,004	48	18	16	8	5	4	2	30
Infratest dimap	31 Mar–5 Apr 2016	1,000	39	18	15	11	6	8	3	21
Trend Research Hamburg	14–18 Jan 2016	759	37	14	13	10	8	13	5	23
2015 state election	15 Feb 2015	–	45.6	15.9	12.3	8.5	7.4	6.1	4.2	29.7

== Election result ==
Strongest party by district.

At one polling booth in Langenhorn, the results for the FDP and Greens were accidentally reversed, meaning the preliminary results placed the FDP only 121 votes above the threshold. The mistake was corrected in the official count which took place over 24 hours later. Exit polls suggested that AfD would miss the threshold while FDP would exceed it, leading to early press reports of an AfD defeat and exclusion of its politicians from post-election debates.

Party	Constituency list			Statewide list			Total seats	+/–
Party	Votes	%	Seats	Votes	%	Seats	Total seats	+/–
Social Democratic Party	1,403,351	34.94	28	1,593,825	39.23	26	54	▼4
Alliance 90/The Greens	1,032,826	25.71	20	981,628	24.16	13	33	▲18
Christian Democratic Union	605,273	15.07	15	453,717	11.17	0	15	▼5
The Left	446,600	11.12	7	368,683	9.08	6	13	▲2
Alternative for Germany	217,201	5.41	0	215,306	5.30	7	7	▼1
Free Democratic Party	220,031	5.48	1	202,059	4.97	0	1	▼8
Die PARTEI				56,755	1.40	0	0	0
Volt	25,524	0.64	0	52,361	1.29	0	0	New
Ecological Democratic Party	25,903	0.64	0	27,617	0.68	0	0	0
Human Environment Animal Protection Party				27,200	0.67	0	0	0
Free Voters	16,357	0.41	0	25,023	0.62	0	0	0
Action Party for Animal Welfare				21,530	0.53	0	0	New
Pirate Party	17,575	0.44	0	20,559	0.51	0	0	0
Party of Humanists				8,354	0.21	0	0	0
Party for Rejuvenation Research				7,759	0.19	0	0	0
Democracy in Motion	2,808	0.07	0				0	New
Human World	1,702	0.04	0				0	0
Independents (Note: Sedat Ayhan)	1,067	0.03	0				0	0
Social Liberal Democratic Movement	653	0.02	0				0	New
Total	4,016,871	100.00	71	4,062,376	100.00	52	123	–
Valid votes	4,016,871	99.62		4,062,376	99.79			
Invalid/blank votes	15,389	0.38		8,737	0.21			
Total votes	4,032,260	100.00		4,071,113	100.00			
Registered voters/turnout		63.0			63.0			

Popular vote
SPD	39.24%
B'90/GRÜNE	24.18%
CDU	11.16%
DIE LINKE	9.09%
AfD	5.29%
FDP	4.96%
Other	6.09%

Bürgerschaft seats
SPD	43.90%
B'90/GRÜNE	26.83%
CDU	12.20%
DIE LINKE	10.57%
AfD	5.69%
FDP	0.81%

== Government formation ==
Mayor Tschentscher stated that exploratory talks with the Greens were "the first priority", but that "we will also - if the majorities are confirmed - approach the CDU and hold a conversation." Marcus Weinberg of the CDU stated he was "ready for talks" with the SPD. Lead candidate for the Greens Katharina Fegebank called for "More red-green, with strong greens in the government." Cansu Özdemir of The Left stated her party wished to remain a strong opposition force.

The SPD and Greens came to a coalition agreement at the end of May. The SPD took 7 ministries and the Greens 4, a net gain of one for the Greens. The vote for Mayor took place on 10 June, and Tschentscher was re-elected Mayor with 87 votes in favour, 34 against, and 2 abstentions. The new cabinet was also approved with 83 votes in favour, 38 against, and 2 abstentions.

== See also ==
- Elections in Hamburg
- Hamburg state elections in the Weimar Republic
