= SPD Hamburg =

Regional state association of the SPD in Hamburg, Germany

SPD Hamburg SPD Hamburg
- Chairperson: Melanie Leonhard; Nils Weiland
- Founded: before 1863
- Headquarters: Kurt-Schumacher-Haus; Kurt-Schumacher-Allee 10; 20097 Hamburg
- Membership (2021): 10,506
- Ideology: Social democracy Pro-Europeanism
- Political position: Centre-left
- National affiliation: Social Democratic Party of Germany

Website
- spd-hamburg.de

The SPD Hamburg, officially SPD State Organisation Hamburg (German: SPD Landesorganisation Hamburg), is the state organisation of the Social Democratic Party of Germany in Hamburg and is the state association with the largest membership of any party in the city state.

== History ==
=== Beginnings ===
Hamburg played a leading role in the founding of the General German Workers' Association (ADAV) in 1863, with help from Wilhelm Liebknecht among others, of the Socialist Workers' Party (SAP) founded in 1875. Hamburg had already been the most important centre of the socialist labour movement in the early 1870s and the seat of most of the trade union executive committees; with 4,000 members represented, Hamburg accounted for 17 percent of the membership at the party congress in 1875.

The enactment of the "Law against the Dangerous Endeavours of Social Democracy", the so-called "Socialist Law" (1878–1890), led to house searches, association closures and trials against party and trade union members, despite the liberal approach of the Hamburg police senator compared to Prussia. The party and trade unions retreated into substitute organisations. At the instigation of Prussia, a minor state of siege was imposed on Hamburg and the surrounding area in the autumn of 1880, enabling the expulsion of 300 Social Democrats whose families were left behind in hardship.

=== Hamburg, economic stronghold ===
The customs annexations that began in 1882 created a special boom in Hamburg, which led to an upswing in trade union "specialised associations", whose high-earning members raised enormous sums for the banned party, which thus became the financial pillar of the SAP throughout the Reich. In all three Hamburg constituencies and constituency 8 Altona-Wandsbek-Stormarn, the votes for the SAP increased steadily in the Reichstag elections. In 1890, the SAP was successful in all three Social Democratic constituencies in the "stronghold of Hamburg" and constituency 8 Altona was also won. August Bebel, Johann Heinrich Wilhelm Dietz and Wilhelm Metzger entered the Reichstag for Hamburg. Karl Frohme represented constituency 8. They remained in the hands of the SAP, which was renamed the Social Democratic Party of Germany (SPD) in 1890, until the end of the German Empire.

In the meantime, Hamburg employers' associations had joined forces and when Hamburg workers demonstrated for the eight-hour day on 1 May 1890, almost 20,000 workers were locked out for months. This led to a turnaround within the workers' organisations to a level of bitterness and radicalism previously unknown in Hamburg. Nevertheless, the SPD took part in the emergency committees during the cholera epidemic of 1892, having previously been commissioned by the Hamburg Senate on 27 August to print 250,000 leaflets with information on hygiene and to distribute them at short notice by its members in return for payment. No other printing company or organisation in the city was able to do both. The Hamburg dockers' strike of 1896/97 had far-reaching consequences, as it could not be sustained against the local employers' associations together with the Ruhr industry.

The right to vote in the Hamburg Parliament, which was linked to citizenship and a certain level of income, meant that Otto Stolten was the first Social Democrat to be elected to the state parliament in 1901; by 1904, there were already 13 (out of 160 seats). The parliament's attempt to change the electoral law in favour of the workers led to a half-day general strike, the first political mass strike in Germany.

During this period, Hamburg remained the capital of the labour movement and the centre of the trade union movement. Under the decisive influence of Adolph von Elm, the co-operative Konsum-, Bau- und Sparverein "Produktion" eGmbH and the trade union and co-operative insurance company "Volksfürsorge" were founded. The co-operative and non-profit enterprises set in motion a movement that came to be known as the third pillar of the labour movement. The impressive trade union building was inaugurated in 1913 by Bebel, who was a member of the Hamburg Reichstag until his death in the same year. It was only during the First World War that Social Democrats were granted offices in the Hamburg administration and parliament.

The party headquarters were at Große Theaterstraße 42-44 from 1887 to 1956 and have been at Kurt-Schumacher-Allee 10 since 1957.

=== Government from 1919 to 1933 ===
In 1919, the majority Social Democrats (1917–1919) in Hamburg were able to prevail against the USPD leadership after a new election in the Hamburg Labour Council. In the parliamentary elections on 16 March 1919, the SPD won 50.5 percent of the vote, the USPD 8.1 percent, and the Social Democrats formed a coalition government with the German Democratic Party (DDP - previously the United Liberals). In the 1921 election, the SPD, which had over 72,000 members in Hamburg, received 40.6 per cent of the vote, the KPD 11 per cent. In addition to the Second Mayor Otto Stolten, the leading Social Democrats included school senator Emil Krause and police senator Adolph Schönfelder. A large number of reforms were implemented, e.g. the introduction of a modern administration, changes to welfare provision, reform-oriented school and youth policies, an exemplary urban development policy (by Fritz Schumacher).

The increasing violent conflicts led to the founding of the Reichsbanner Schwarz-Rot-Gold in February 1924, in which Hamburg Social Democrats played a key role. Following the success of the NSDAP in the 1930 Reichstag elections, SPD chairman Karl Meitmann warned that Adolf Hitler wanted "power, all power", which he would secure with "rivers of blood" if necessary.

=== Resistance and persecution 1933–1945 ===
Following Hitler's appointment as Reich Chancellor on 30 January 1933, the Reichstag Fire Decree of 28 February 1933 restricted the freedoms guaranteed in the constitution, including freedom of the press. When the Nazi regime demanded that the Hamburg Senate ban the SPD party newspaper "Hamburger Echo", the Social Democratic mayor Rudolf Ross and the SPD senators Emil Krause, Adolph Schönfelder, Paul Neumann, Heinrich Eisenbarth and John Ehrenteit resigned on 3 March 1933. With the election of a National Socialist-led Senate on 8 March 1933, state terror also began in Hamburg. The new rulers systematically restricted the freedom of movement and public appearance of the SPD, and the first arrests followed.

The three Hamburg SPD MPs Adolf Biedermann, Gustav Dahrendorf and Hans Staudinger were among the 94 members of the SPD parliamentary group in the Reichstag who voted against the Enabling Act of 24 March 1933.

With the confiscation of party assets on 10 May 1933, the party's ability to act was further restricted. Preparations for illegality and adherence to the course of legality were also discussed in Hamburg. The adjustment policy of the General German Trade Union Confederation (ADGB) led to the withdrawal of part of the trade union wing from the SPD parliamentary group at the end of May 1933. On 15 and 16 June 1933, the Hamburg SPD leadership - the party executive, members of the Reichstag and Bürgerschaft and the district leaders - met in the editorial offices of the "Hamburger Echo" to discuss the political situation. The more than 30 participants were arrested and in some cases severely ill-treated by the National Socialists. After a charge of preparation for high treason failed, all the prisoners were released after several weeks in custody. The events in Hamburg also helped the National Socialists at Reich level to ban the SPD on 22 June 1933.

Walter Schmedemann then built up the illegal Hamburg SPD leadership, which maintained a broad organisational network with its own intelligence agency. However, the resistance work was not uniformly organised. Numerous groups recruited from the SAJ (Socialist Workers' Youth), Young Socialists, Reichsbanner people and workers' sportsmen developed their own activities.

The illegal leadership of the Hamburg SPD was arrested several times and had to be replaced. Until March 1938, Walter Siering and Wilhelm Bock managed to maintain contact with the border secretariat of the SPD exile executive in Copenhagen. From the end of 1942, Gustav Dahrendorf belonged to the inner circle of Social Democratic trade union resistance around Julius Leber and Wilhelm Leuschner. In 1943, he informed Adolph Schönfelder and Herbert Ruscheweyh about the plans for the coup.

=== Post-war era and reconstruction ===
After the end of the war, the Social Democrats under Karl Meitmann, Walter Schmedemann and Adolph Schönfelder began to rebuild the Hamburg party. By the end of 1946, the SPD had around 44,000 members, and by 1948 the number of members in the party organisation, which now also extended to Altona, Harburg-Wilhelmsburg and Wandsbek as a result of the Greater Hamburg Act, had risen to 55,000. The first parliamentary election on 13 October 1946 clearly showed the majority situation: the SPD won the election with 43.1% of the vote. The majority voting system decreed by the occupying power gave the Social Democrats 83 of the 110 seats in parliament. The former mayor of Altona, Max Brauer, became the first mayor of the badly damaged city.

In the 1949 parliamentary elections, the SPD once again achieved an absolute majority in the parliament with 42.8% of the vote. Four years later, the SPD won 45.2% of the vote, but had to concede defeat to the Hamburg Block, a bourgeois electoral alliance, and go into opposition. With its leading candidate Max Brauer, the SPD won 53.9% of the vote in 1957 and returned to government. Opposition leader Paul Nevermann, who had rendered outstanding services to the reconstruction of Hamburg as a building senator, took over as mayor in 1960 and won the 1961 parliamentary elections with 57.4% of the vote. He was succeeded in 1965 by Herbert Weichmann, who was already 69 years old and who achieved the SPD's best result to date in 1966 with 59.0% of the vote.

The Hamburg SPD members Helmut Schmidt and Herbert Wehner had a significant influence on the SPD's federal politics.

=== Development into a governing party ===
Until February 2011, the SPD was in opposition in Hamburg. After the break-up of the CDU/Schill/FDP coalition and the subsequent new election, which gave the CDU an absolute majority in the parliament, the SPD only managed 30.5%. Internal party conflicts had overshadowed the 2008 pre-election campaign. Under the new state chairman Ingo Egloff, the SPD put forward Michael Naumann, publisher of Die Zeit and former Minister of State for Culture, as its candidate for mayor, who achieved a respectable result of 34.1%, but was unable to regain the ability to govern for the Social Democrats. Instead, the first black-green state government in Germany was formed under CDU member Ole von Beust. SPD member of the Bundestag and former Federal Minister of Labour Olaf Scholz, who had previously been SPD state chairman from 2000 to 2004, took over the party office again in 2009. Under his leadership, the SPD succeeded in demonstrating unity and raising its political profile. The state association confirmed Scholz in office in 2012 with 94.2% of the vote, in 2014 with 94.8% and in 2016 with 97.4%.

Following the break-up of the black-green Senate, Olaf Scholz was nominated as the top candidate for the February 2011 parliamentary elections at the state party conference on 17 December 2010. With 48.4% of the vote, the SPD won 62 seats and thus not only an absolute majority of seats in parliament, but also more than twice as many votes as the CDU. Four years later, the SPD lost its absolute majority and only won 58 seats in parliament. However, with a 45.6% share of the vote, it was almost three times as strong as the CDU, which continued to lose ground. As a result, the Social Democrats under Scholz entered into a red-green coalition for the second time after 1997 to 2001, which was confirmed by the Hamburg Parliament on 15 April 2015.

After Olaf Scholz joined Angela Merkel's fourth cabinet as Federal Minister of Finance on 14 March 2018, Finance Senator Peter Tschentscher was elected as his successor as First Mayor on 28 March 2018. Social Affairs Senator Melanie Leonhard was elected as the new chairwoman of the Hamburg SPD on 24 March 2018. In the 2021 election, the Hamburg SPD elected Leonhard alongside Nils Weiland as co-chairmen. Both were re-elected for a two-year term in November 2023.

== Chairmen ==
Year	Chairman
1906–1919	Heinrich Stubbe
1919–1928	Max Leuteritz
1928–1933, 1946–1952	Karl Meitmann
1952–1966	Karl Vittinghoff
1966–1970	Paul Nevermann
1970–1980	Oswald Paulig
1980–1981	Werner Staak
1981–1983	Jörg König
1983–1988	Ortwin Runde
1988–1991	Traute Müller
1991–1994	Helmuth Frahm
1994–2000	Jörg Kuhbier
2000–2004	Olaf Scholz
2004–2007	Mathias Petersen
2007–2009	Ingo Egloff
2009–2018	Olaf Scholz
2018–2021	Melanie Leonhard
2021–	Melanie Leonhard and Nils Weiland

== Member of the SPD Hamburg in the German Bundestag ==
The state association of the SPD in Hamburg is currently represented by five members in the German Bundestag.

Niels Annen	2005–2009, 2013–	Elected through the party's state list
Falko Droßmann	2021–	Member of Parliament for the Hamburg-Mitte constituency
Metin Hakverdi	2013–	Member of Parliament for the Hamburg-Bergedorf-Harburg constituency
Dorothee Martin	2020–	Member of Parliament for the Hamburg-Nord constituency
Aydan Özoğuz	2009–	Member of Parliament for the Hamburg-Wandsbek constituency
