= Karen Pein =

German politician (born 1973)

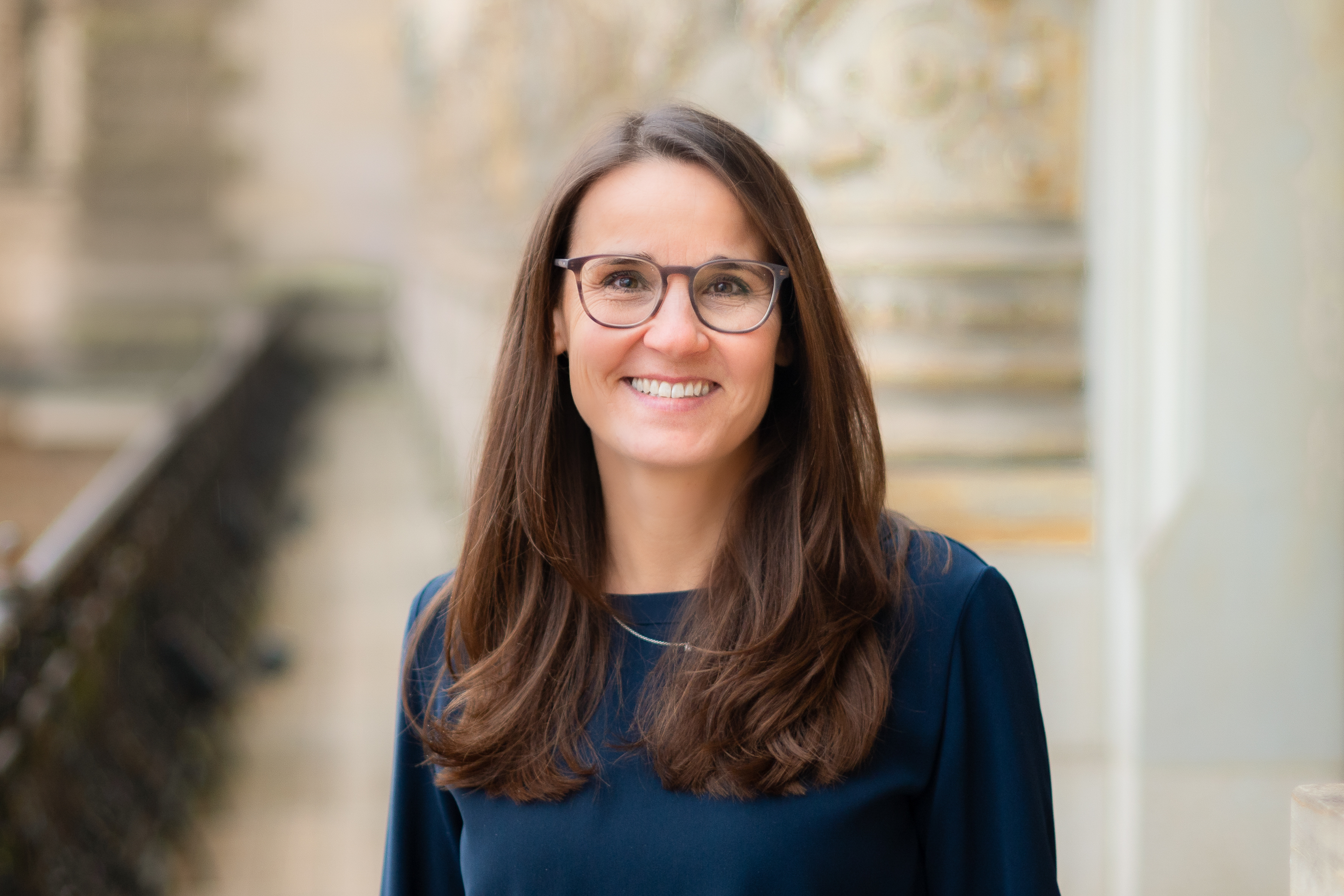
- Pein in 2022

Senator for Urban Development and Housing of Hamburg
- Incumbent
- Assumed office 15 December 2022
- Mayor: Peter Tschentscher
- Preceded by: Dorothee Stapelfeldt

Personal details
- Born: 1973 (age 52–53) Hamburg
- Party: Social Democratic Party
- Spouse: Milan Pein

Karen Stephanie Pein (née Vollmann; born 1973 in Hamburg) is a German politician serving as senator for urban development and housing of Hamburg since 2022. She has served as deputy chairwoman of the Social Democratic Party in Lokstedt since 2012. From 2015 to 2022, she served as managing director of the IBA Hamburg. She is married to Milan Pein.
