= First Tschentscher senate =

State government of Hamburg city-state in Germany from 2018 to 2020

First Senate of Peter Tschentscher Senate Tschentscher I
- 29th Senate of Hamburg
- 28 March 2018 – 9 June 2020
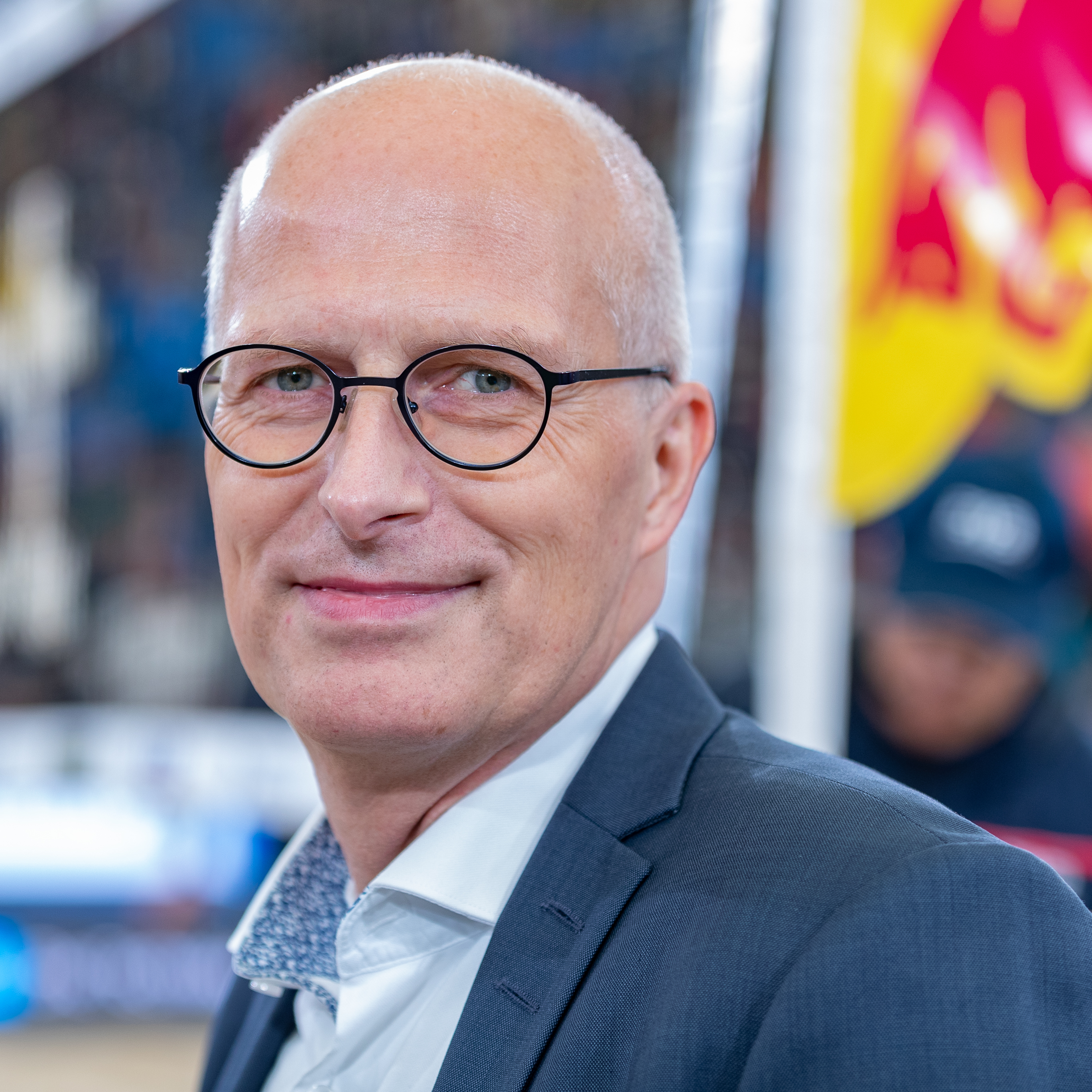
- Peter Tschentscher at the 2019 Beach Volleyball World Championships in Hamburg
- Date formed: 28 March 2018
- Date dissolved: 9 June 2020

People and organisations
- First Mayor: Peter Tschentscher
- Second Mayor: Katharina Fegebank
- No. of ministers: 11
- Member parties: Social Democratic Party; Alliance 90/The Greens
- Status in legislature: Majority (Coalition)
- Opposition parties: Christian Democratic Union; The Left; Free Democratic Party; Alternative for Germany

History
- Election: None
- Legislature term: 21st Hamburg Parliament
- Predecessor: Second Scholz senate
- Successor: Second Tschentscher senate

The First Tschentscher senate was the state government of Hamburg between 2018 and 2020, sworn in on 28 March 2018 after Peter Tschentscher was elected as First Mayor by the members of the Hamburg Parliament. It was the 29th Senate of Hamburg.

It was formed after the resignation of First Mayor Olaf Scholz, and was a continuation of the coalition government formed by the Social Democratic Party (SPD) and Alliance 90/The Greens (GRÜNE) after the 2015 Hamburg state election. Excluding the First Mayor, the senate comprised 11 ministers, called Senators. Seven were members of the SPD, three were members of the Greens, and one was an independent politician.

The first Tschentscher senate was succeeded by the second Tschentscher senate on 10 June 2020.

== Formation ==
The previous Senate was a coalition government of the SPD and Greens led by First Mayor Olaf Scholz. On 9 March 2018, he announced his switch to federal politics after being nominated as Vice-Chancellor and Minister for Finance in the fourth Merkel cabinet.

The same day, finance senator Peter Tschentscher was nominated as his successor by the SPD executive. Scholz formally resigned on 13 March. Tschentscher was approved by the party congress on 24 March with 95% of votes in favour.

Peter Tschentscher was elected as First Mayor by the Parliament on 28 March, winning 71 votes out of 121 cast.

== Composition ==
The composition of the Senate at the time of its dissolution was as follows:

Portfolio	Senator	Party	Took office	Left office	State secretaries
President of the Senate and First Mayor; Senate Chancellery	Peter Tschentscher born 20 January 1966 (age 60)	SPD	28 March 2018	9 June 2020	Almut Möller (European and Int'l Affairs, Representative to the Federal Government); Jan Pörksen (Head of the Senate Chancellery and Personnel Office)
Second Mayor Office for Science, Research and Equality	Katharina Fegebank born 27 February 1977 (age 49)	GRÜNE	28 March 2018	9 June 2020	Eva Gümbel
Office for Justice and Consumer Protection	Till Steffen born 22 July 1973 (age 52)	GRÜNE	28 March 2018	9 June 2020	Katja Günther
Office for Education and Vocational Training	Ties Rabe born 14 November 1960 (age 65)	SPD	28 March 2018	9 June 2020	Rainer Schulz
Office for Culture and Media	Carsten Brosda born 3 October 1974 (age 51)	SPD	28 March 2018	9 June 2020	Jana Schiedek
Office for Labour, Social Affairs, Family and Integration	Melanie Leonhard born 14 July 1977 (age 48)	SPD	28 March 2018	9 June 2020	Petra Lotzkat
Office for Health and Consumer Protection	Cornelia Prüfer-Storcks born 8 May 1956 (age 69)	SPD	28 March 2018	9 June 2020	Matthias Gruhl
Office for Urban Development and Housing	Dorothee Stapelfeldt born 12 August 1956 (age 69)	SPD	28 March 2018	9 June 2020	Matthias Kock
Office for Environment and Energy	Jens Kerstan born 18 February 1966 (age 60)	GRÜNE	28 March 2018	9 June 2020	Michael Pollmann
Office for Economics, Transport and Innovation	Frank Horch born 25 February 1948 (age 78)	Ind.	28 March 2018	31 October 2018	Torsten Sevecke (Economics and Innovation); Andreas Rieckhof (Transport)
Office for Economics, Transport and Innovation	Michael Westhagemann born 9 August 1957 (age 68)	Ind.	1 November 2018	9 June 2020	Torsten Sevecke (Economics and Innovation); Andreas Rieckhof (Transport)
Office for Interior and Sport	Andy Grote born 14 June 1968 (age 57)	SPD	28 March 2018	9 June 2020	Bernd Krösser (Interior); Christoph Holstein (Sport)
Office for Finance	Andreas Dressel born 6 January 1975 (age 51)	SPD	28 March 2018	9 June 2020	Bettina Lentz
