= Maryam Blumenthal =

German politician (born 1985)

Senator for Science of Hamburg
- Incumbent
- Assumed office 7 May 2025
- Mayor: Peter Tschentscher
- Preceded by: Katharina Fegebank

Personal details
- Born: 2 July 1985 (age 40)
- Party: Alliance 90/The Greens

Maryam Blumenthal (born 2 July 1985) is an Iranian-born German politician serving as senator for science of Hamburg since 2025. From 2021 to 2025, she served as co-chair of Alliance 90/The Greens Hamburg.
