= Ksenija Bekeris =

German politician (born 1978)

Senator for Education of Hamburg
- Incumbent
- Assumed office 17 January 2024
- Mayor: Peter Tschentscher
- Preceded by: Ties Rabe

Personal details
- Born: 11 April 1978 (age 48) Hamburg
- Party: Social Democratic Party

Ksenija Milda Bekeris (born 11 April 1978 in Hamburg) is a German politician serving as senator for education of Hamburg since 2024. From 2008 to 2024, she was a member of the Hamburg Parliament.
