= Anjes Tjarks =

German politician (born 1981)

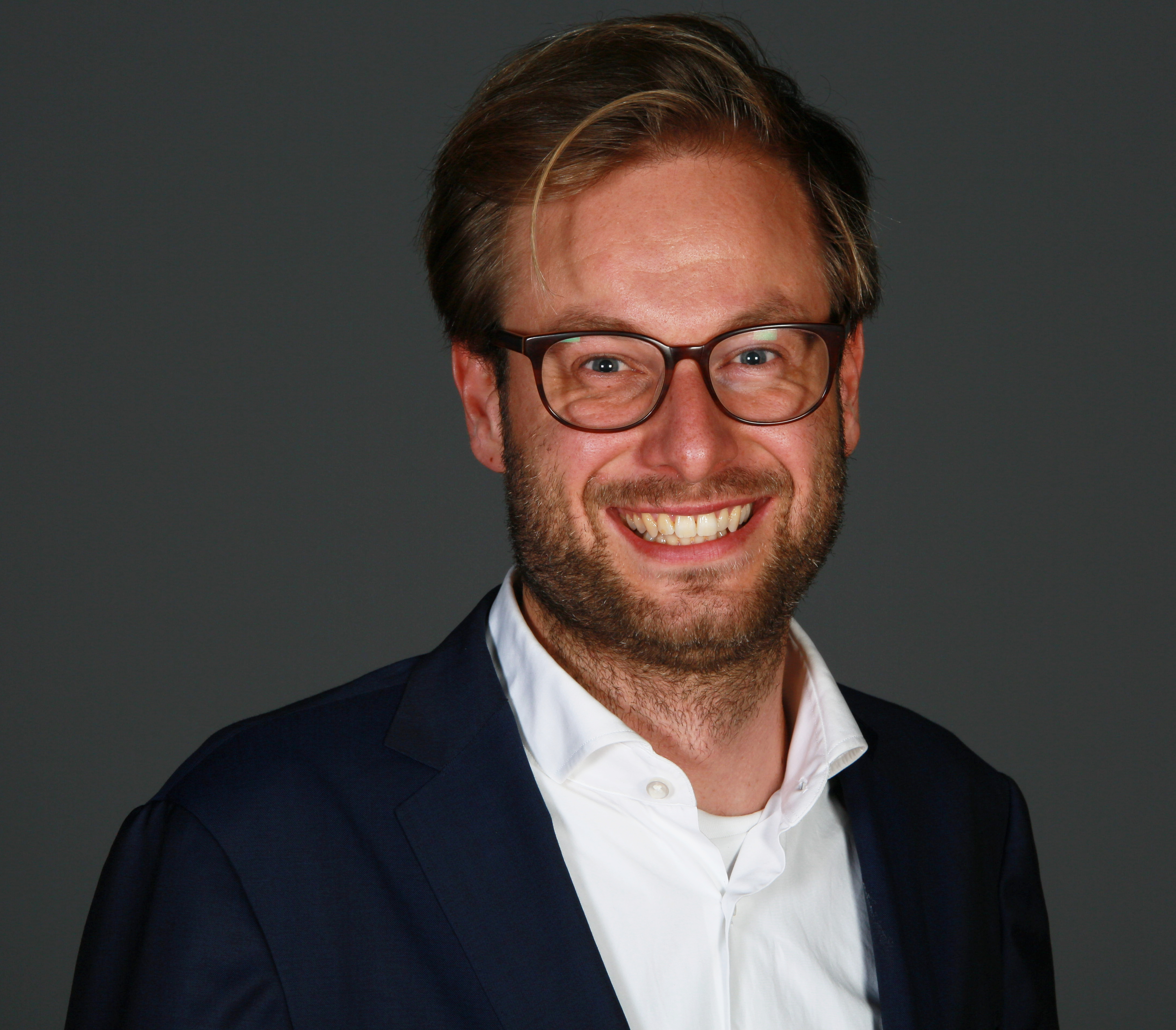
- Tjarks in 2018

Senator for Transport and Mobility Transition of Hamburg
- Incumbent
- Assumed office 10 June 2020
- Mayor: Peter Tschentscher

Personal details
- Born: 12 March 1981 (age 45) Hamburg
- Party: Alliance 90/The Greens (since 1998)

Hans Anjes Tjarks (born 12 March 1981 in Hamburg) is a German politician serving as senator for transport and mobility transition of Hamburg since 2020. From 2011 to 2020, he was a member of the Hamburg Parliament.
