= Katharina Fegebank =

German politician (born 1977)

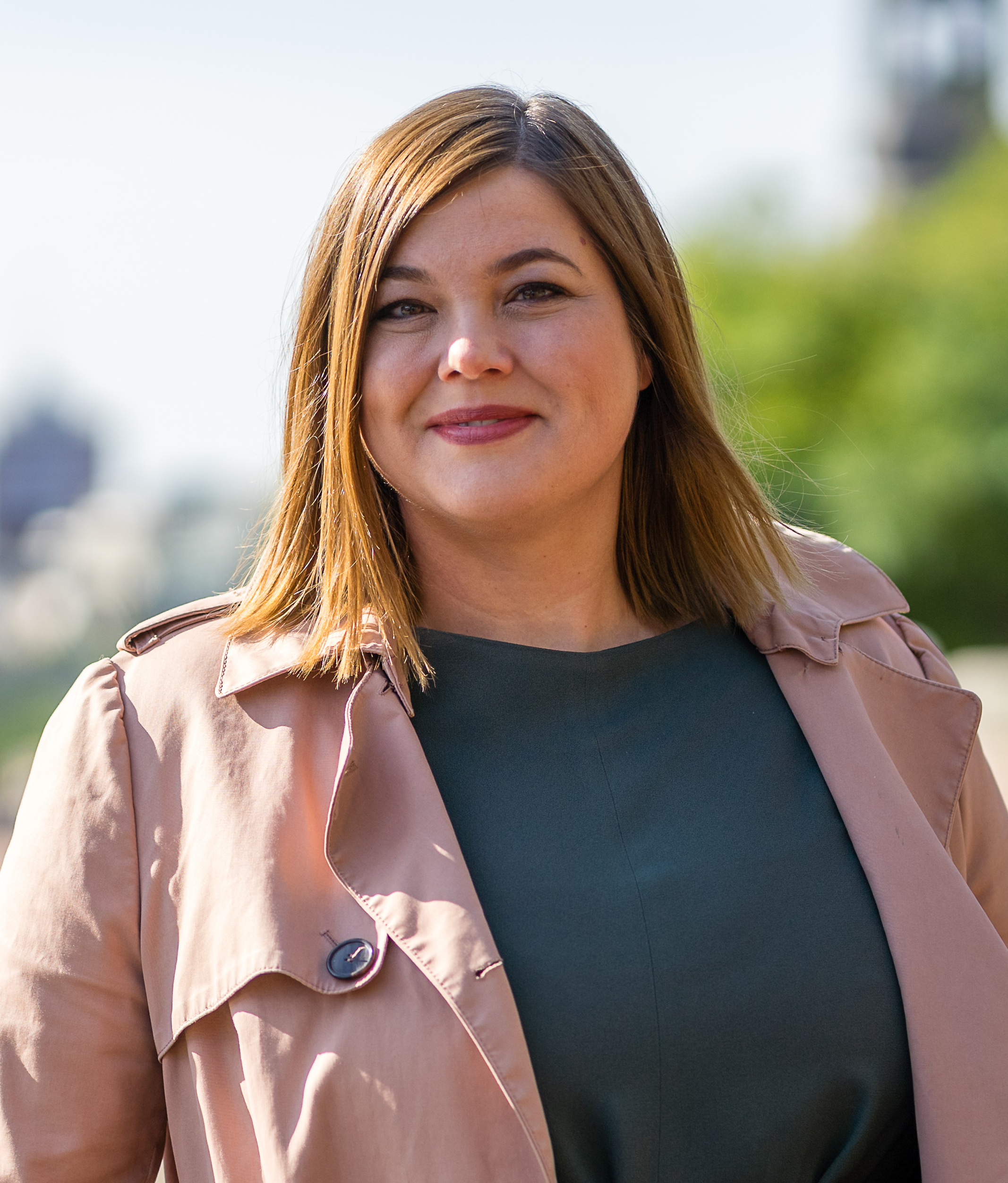
- Fegebank in 2018

123rd Second Mayor of Hamburg
- Incumbent
- Assumed office 15 April 2015
- First Mayor: Olaf Scholz; Herself (Acting); Peter Tschentscher
- Preceded by: Dorothee Stapelfeldt

Senator for the Environment, Climate, Energy, and Agriculture of Hamburg
- Incumbent
- Assumed office 7 May 2025
- First Mayor: Peter Tschentscher
- Preceded by: Jens Kerstan

Senator for Science, Research, Equality and Municipalities of Hamburg
- In office 15 April 2015 – 7 May 2025
- First Mayor: Olaf Scholz; Herself (Acting); Peter Tschentscher
- Preceded by: Dorothee Stapelfeldt
- Succeeded by: Maryam Blumenthal

First Mayor of Hamburg Acting
- In office 13 March 2018 – 28 March 2018
- Second Mayor: Herself
- Preceded by: Olaf Scholz
- Succeeded by: Peter Tschentscher

Leader of the Alliance 90/The Greens in Hamburg
- In office 7 May 2008 – 30 May 2015
- Deputy: Manuel Sarrazin
- Preceded by: Anja Hajduk
- Succeeded by: Anna Gallina

Personal details
- Born: 27 February 1977 (age 49) Bad Oldesloe, Schleswig-Holstein, West Germany
- Party: Alliance '90/The Greens

Katharina Fegebank (born 27 February 1977) is a German politician for the Alliance '90/The Greens, who has served as Second Mayor of Hamburg since 2015. She has been serving as Senator for the Environment, Climate Action, Energy and Agriculture since May 2025. Prior to that, she served as Senator for Science, Research, Equality and Boroughs from April 2015.

== Background ==
Fegebank grew up in Bargteheide as the daughter of two teachers.

== Political career ==
On 22 June 2008, Fegebank was elected chair of the Green-Alternative List (GAL) in Hamburg, and became the youngest ever leader of a Green state association. Since 15 April 2015, she serves as Second Mayor of Hamburg as well as Senator for Science, Research, and Equal Rights in the Senate Scholz II. In this capacity, she is one of the state's representatives at the Bundesrat.

Fegebank was a Green Party delegate to the Federal Convention for the purpose of electing the President of Germany in 2017 and in 2022.

On 14 March 2018, Fegebank became the acting head of the government of Hamburg after Olaf Scholz moved to the new Federal Government, until Peter Tschentscher was elected new Mayor of Hamburg on 28 March 2018. She continued to serve as Second Mayor and Senator for Science, Research, and Equal Rights in his government.

In the negotiations to form a so-called traffic light coalition of the Social Democrats (SPD), the Green Party and the FDP following the 2021 federal elections, Fegebank led her party's delegation in the working group on innovation and research; her co-chairs from the other parties are Thomas Losse-Müller and Lydia Hüskens.

== Other activities ==
- Aby Warburg Foundation, Chairwoman of the Board
- Academy of Sciences and Humanities in Hamburg, Ex-Officio Member of the Board of Trustees
- Alexander Otto Sportstiftung, Member of the Advisory Board
- Hamburgische Regenbogenstiftung, Member of the Board of Trustees
- Institute for the History of the German Jews (Institut für die Geschichte der deutschen Juden, IGdJ), Hamburg, Chair of the Advisory Board (Kuratorium)
- Hamburg Marketing Gesellschaft mbH (HMG GmbH), Ex-Officio Member of the Supervisory Board
- Hamburg Media School (HMS), Member of the Supervisory Board
- Helmholtz Association of German Research Centres, Ex-Officio Member of the Senate
- Max Planck Institute for Comparative and International Private Law, Member of the Board of Trustees
- Max Planck Institute for Meteorology, Member of the Board of Trustees
- University Medical Center Hamburg-Eppendorf, Chairwoman of the Board of Trustees

== Political positions ==
Fegebank supports a ban on full-face veils in schools, arguing that the burqa and the niqāb are "symbols of oppression".

She does not support a rent cap in Hamburg.

== Personal life ==
Fegebank has been in a relationship with businessman Mathias Wolf since 2015. In 2018, she became a mother of twin daughters. The family lives in Hamburg's Eilbek district. In July 2019, the family's house was vandalized.
