= Melanie Leonhard =

German politician and historian

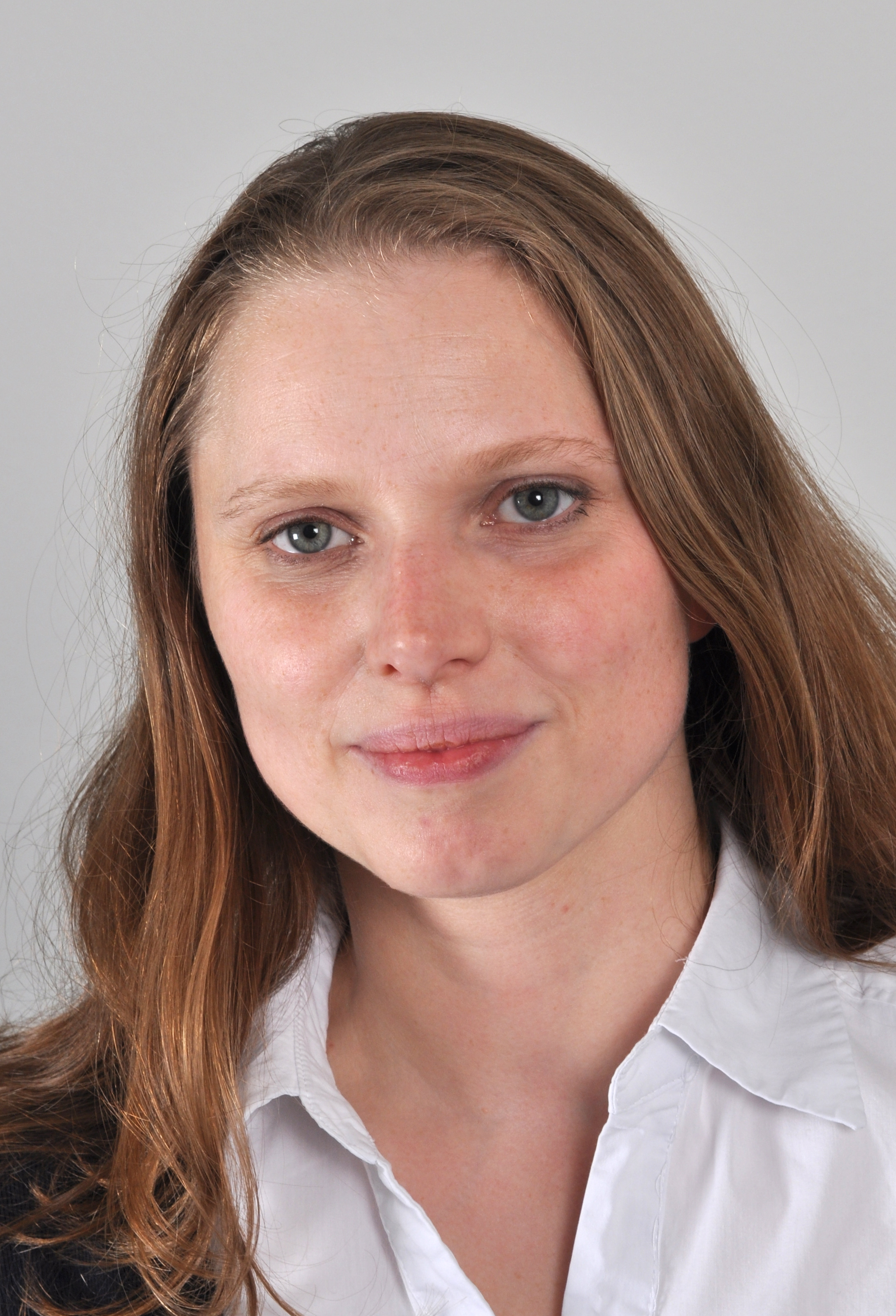
Leonhard in 2011

Melanie Leonhard (born 14 July 1977) is a German historian and politician of the Social Democratic Party of Germany (SPD) who has been serving as State Minister for Economic Affairs in the Government of Hamburg since 2022. She previously was the State Minister of Labor, Social Affairs, Family and Integration under mayors Olaf Scholz and Peter Tschentscher from 2015 to 2022. Since March 2018 has been the chair of the SPD Hamburg.

== Education and early career ==
Leonhard was born and grew up in Wilhelmsburg, Hamburg. Her father worked for a petroleum company. After attending high school Lessing-Gymnasium, which she completed in 1996, she performed a Voluntary social year. Afterwards she studied social and economic history at the University of Hamburg from 1998 to 2004 with minor subjects in Politics and Geography. There she received her doctorate in 2009 with a thesis on the development of a family business, the Rickmers family of ship owners and shipbuilders in German shipbuilding and German shipping from 1834 to 1918. From 2008 to 2013 she was a research associate at E.R. Capital Holding, the holding company of E.R. Schiffahrt and Nordcapital, and from 2013 to 2015 she was head of the Department of Urban History Harburg of the Archaeological Museum Hamburg.

== Political career ==
=== Early beginnings ===
Leonhard has been a member of the SPD since 1999 and represented her party from 2004 to 2011 at the Harburg district assembly. In the state election in Hamburg in 2011, she was elected on place 9 of the state list to the Hamburg Parliament. There she was a member of the Family, Children and Youth Committee, the Interior Committee, the Urban Development Committee, as well as the special committee on the death of the girl Chantal.

In the state election in Hamburg in 2015, she ran on place 6 of the state list and moved again into the state parliament.

=== Career in state government ===
On 1 October 2015 Leonhard followed Detlef Scheele as a state minister (senator) and head of the Hamburg Authority of Labor, Social Affairs, Family and Integration. Since then, her parliamentary mandate has rested under Article 39 of the Hamburg constitution. As one of the state's representatives at the Bundesrat, she also serves on the Committee on Labour, Integration and Social Policy; the Committee on Family and Senior Citizen Affairs; and the Committee on Women and Youth.

In the negotiations to form a fourth coalition government under the leadership of Chancellor Angela Merkel following the 2017 federal elections, Leonhard was part of the working group on families, women, seniors and youth, led by Annette Widmann-Mauz, Angelika Niebler and Katarina Barley.

On 24 March 2018, Leonhard was elected with 94.6 percent of the delegate votes as the successor of Olaf Scholz, the Federal Finance Minister in the cabinet Merkel IV, as state chairwoman of the SPD Hamburg.

In the negotiations to form a so-called traffic light coalition of the SPD, the Green Party and the Free Democrats (FDP) following the 2021 German elections, Leonhard was part of her party's delegation in the working group on social policy, co-chaired by Dagmar Schmidt, Sven Lehmann and Johannes Vogel.

Leonhard was nominated by her party as delegate to the Federal Convention for the purpose of electing the President of Germany in 2022.

== Other activities ==
- Stiftung Lesen, Member of the Board of Trustees

== Personal life ==
Leonhard is married and lives with her husband and son in Marmstorf, Hamburg.
