= Anna Gallina =

German politician (born 1983)

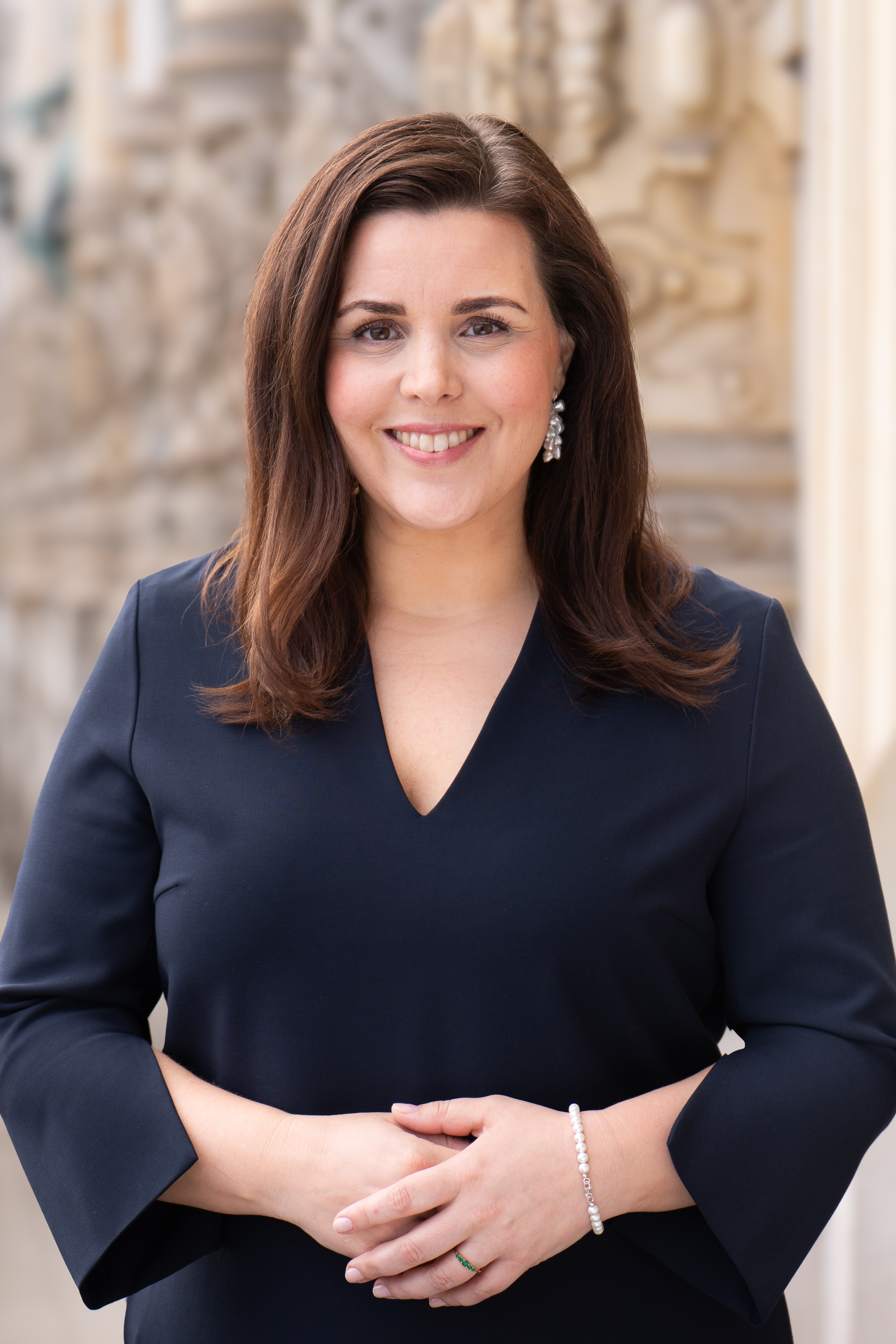
- Gallina in 2025

Senator for Justice and Consumer Protection of Hamburg
- Incumbent
- Assumed office 10 June 2020
- Mayor: Peter Tschentscher
- Preceded by: Till Steffen

Personal details
- Born: 22 June 1983 (age 42) Hamburg
- Party: Alliance 90/The Greens (since 2010)

Anna Gesche Lydia Gallina (born 22 June 1983) is a German politician serving as senator for justice and consumer protection of Hamburg since 2020. From 2015 to 2020, she was a member of the Hamburg Parliament. From 2015 to 2021, she served as chairwoman of Alliance 90/The Greens Hamburg.
