= Andreas Dressel =

German politician

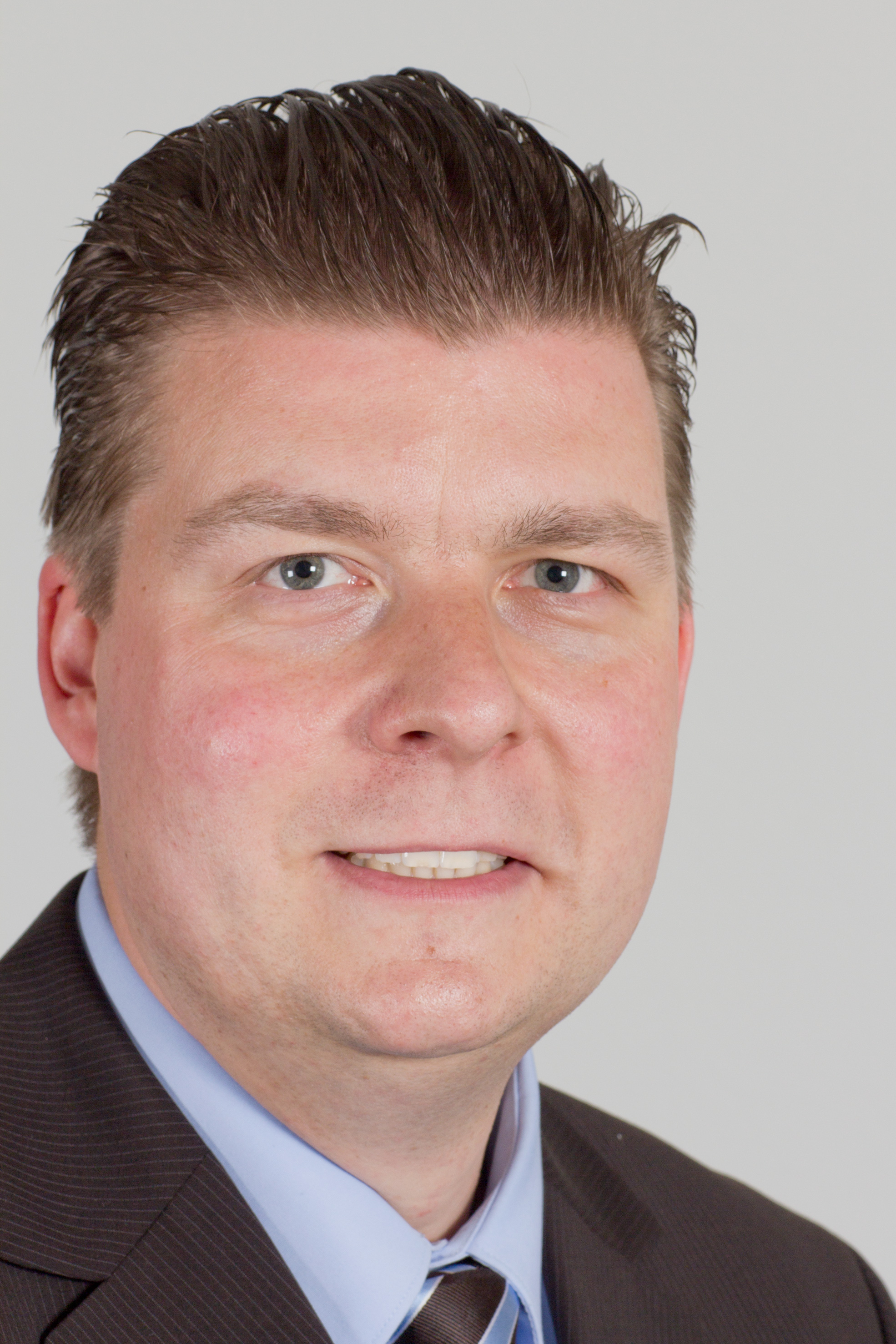

Senator for Finance of Hamburg
- Incumbent
- Assumed office 28 March 2018
- Mayor: Peter Tschentscher
- Preceded by: Peter Tschentscher

Personal details
- Born: 6 January 1975 (age 51) Hamburg, West Germany (now Germany)
- Party: Social Democratic Party
- Education: University of Hamburg

Andreas Dressel (born 6 January 1975) is a German politician (SPD) and since 28 March 2018 Finance Senator of the city state of Hamburg (Senate Tschentscher). From 2011 to 2018, he was chairman of the SPD Parliamentary Group in the Hamburg Parliament.

== Education and early career ==
Dressel was born in Hamburg, where he graduated from the Walddörfer-Gymnasium in Volksdorf. He studied law at the University of Hamburg and completed his legal training in Hamburg and Los Angeles. He was a research assistant of Ulrich Karpen. He earned his doctorate in law at the University of Hamburg on the topic "citizen requests and referendums in the Hamburg districts".

== Political career ==
Dressel has been a member of the SPD since 1994. He acts as Deputy Chairman of the SPD Local Association Volksdorf and as chairman of the SPD district Wandsbek. Between 1997 and 2001 he was a member of the District Assembly Wandsbek (focus: youth welfare, culture and finance, business and transport). From 2001 to 2004 he was a deputy of the judiciary and advisory board in the prison Billwerder.

After the state elections in 2004, he became a member of the Hamburg Parliament for the first time since 17 March 2004. In the 18th electoral term, he sat in the Submission, Interior, Legal and Constitutional Committees and in the Parliamentary Committee of Inquiry (PUA) "Information Sharing". He was also a member of the Supervisory Committees Letter, Postal and Telecommunications Secrecy, Housing Surveillance and Protection of the Constitution.

From 2004 to 2011, Dressel was a spokesman for interior policies of his parliamentary group.

In February 2008, after the state elections, he moved again to the state parliament for the constituency Alstertal-Walddörfer. During this term, he served on the Committee on Budgets, the Committee on Internal Affairs, the Legal Affairs Committee, the Civil Service and Human Resources Committee, the Constitutional and District Committees and the Monitoring Committee on Housing Surveillance.

In the election in February 2011, Dressel was re-elected as leading SPD candidate of the constituency of Alstertal-Walddörfer. Dressel was elected chairman of the SPD parliamentary group. He also served as Head of Unit for Housing, Urban Renewal and Land Use of the Hamburg Authority of Urban Development and the Environment, but has been on leave permanently without payment.

In the state election on 15 February 2015, Dressel again won a direct mandate in the constituency Alstertal-Walddörfer. He was confirmed at the inaugural meeting of the SPD Group in the state parliament in his capacity as Group Chairman.

Dressel had been considered by many as obvious successor of Olaf Scholz as Mayor of Hamburg, but declined for personal reasons. As one of the state’s representatives at the Bundesrat since 2018, he is a member of the Finance Committee.

== Other activities ==
- Alexander Otto Sportstiftung, Member of the Advisory Board
- KfW, Member of the Board of Supervisory Directors (2021–2024)

== Personal life ==
Dressel is married and has three children. He resides in Volksdorf, Hamburg.
