= Peter Tschentscher =

German politician (born 1966)

Senator Peter Tschentscher MdBR
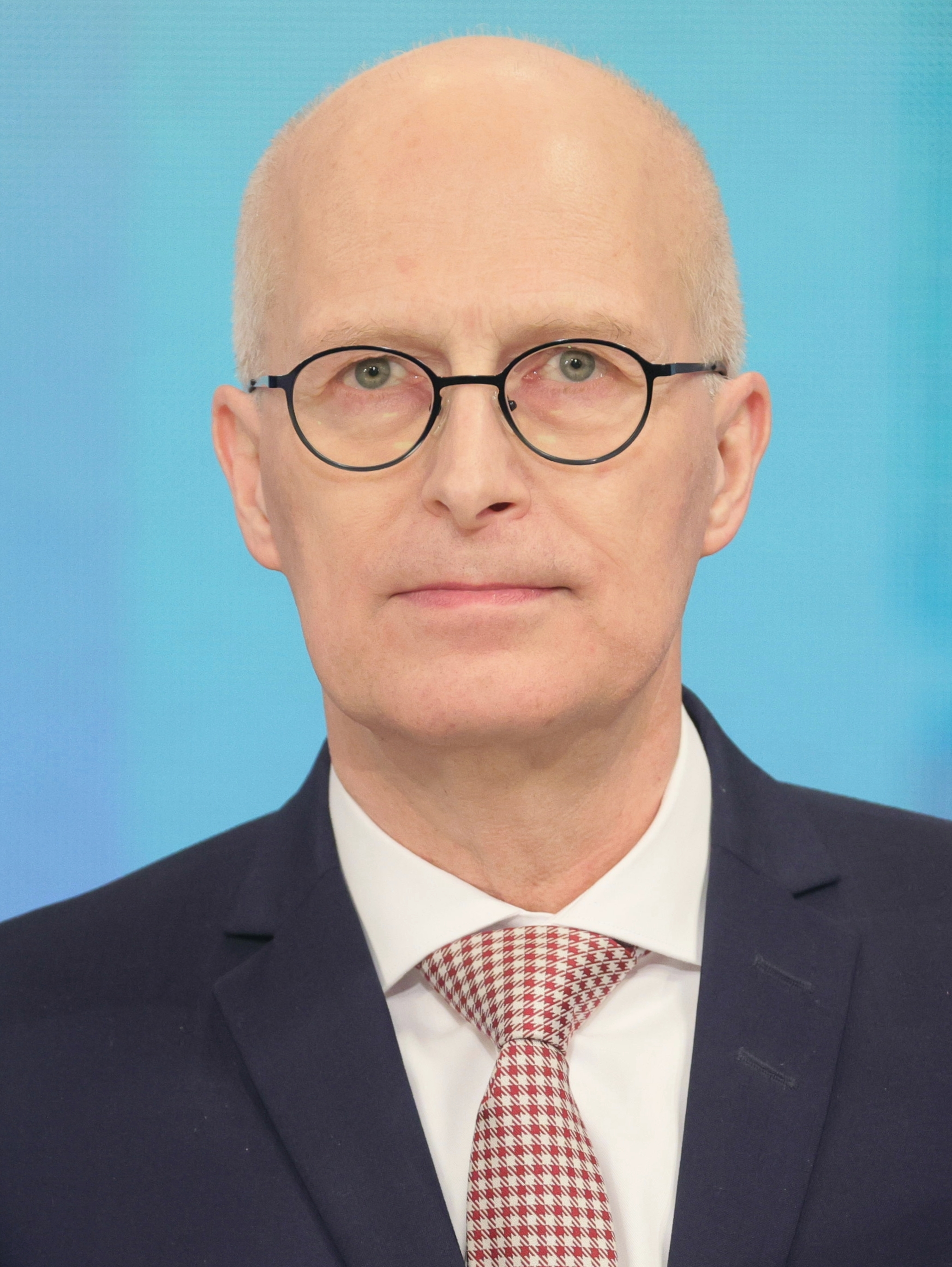
- Tschentscher in 2025

105th First Mayor of Hamburg
- Incumbent
- Assumed office 28 March 2018
- Second Mayor: Katharina Fegebank
- Preceded by: Katharina Fegebank (acting); Olaf Scholz

President of the Bundesrat
- In office 1 November 2022 – 31 October 2023
- First Vice President: Bodo Ramelow
- Preceded by: Bodo Ramelow
- Succeeded by: Manuela Schwesig

Senator of Finance of Hamburg
- In office 7 March 2011 – 28 March 2018
- First Mayor: Olaf Scholz
- Preceded by: Herlind Gundelach
- Succeeded by: Andreas Dressel
Parliamentary constituencies
Member of the Hamburg Parliament
In office 18 March 2020 – 18 March 2020
Preceded by	multi-member district
Succeeded by	Ekkehard Wysocki
Constituency	Social Democratic Party List
In office 2 March 2015 – 2 March 2015
Preceded by	multi-member district
Succeeded by	multi-member district
Constituency	Social Democratic Party List
In office 12 March 2008 – 23 March 2011
Preceded by	multi-member district
Succeeded by	Uwe Lohmann
Constituency	Social Democratic Party List

Personal details
- Born: 20 January 1966 (age 60) Bremen, Free Hanseatic City of Bremen, West Germany (now Germany)
- Party: Social Democratic Party (1989–)
- Education: University of Hamburg
- Occupation: Politician; Physician; Lecturer
- Website: Official website

Peter Tschentscher (German pronunciation: [ˈpeːtɐ ˈtʃɛntʃɐ]; born 20 January 1966) is a German politician of the Social Democratic Party (SPD). Since 28 March 2018 he has been the First Mayor of Hamburg. As First Mayor, he is head of the current government of the city-state. Since 2008 he has been a member of the Hamburg Parliament. From 2011 until 2018 he served as State Minister of Finance in the first and second governments of Olaf Scholz.

== Early life and education ==
Tschentscher graduated from high school in Oldenburg in 1985. He later studied medicine and molecular biology at the University of Hamburg, where he received his Doctor of Medicine degree in 1995. From 1994 until 2008 he practised as a physician at the University Medical Center Hamburg-Eppendorf.

== Political career ==
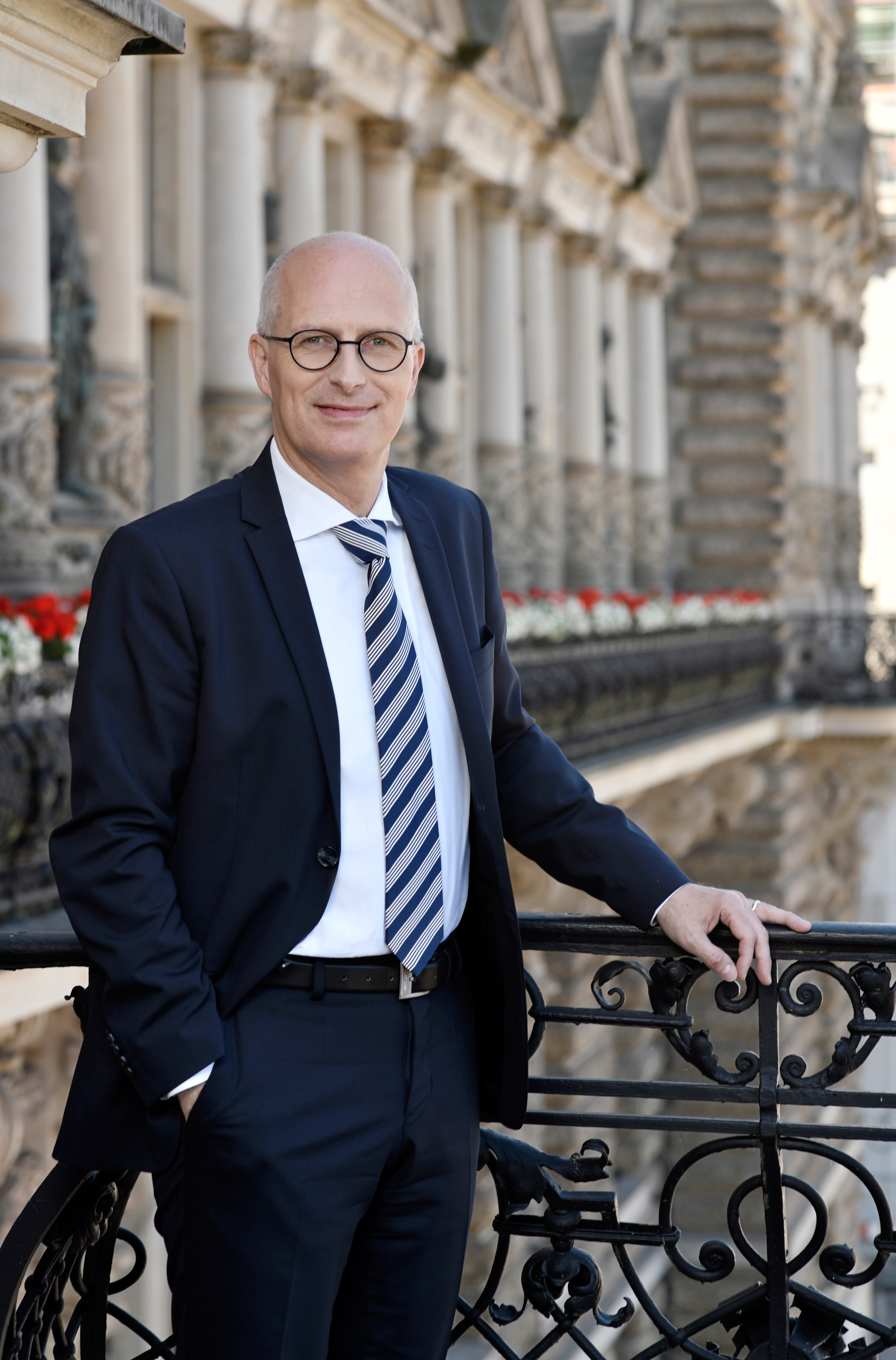
Official portrait

Tschentscher joined the Social Democratic Party in 1989. From 2007 until 2018 he served as chairman of the SPD district Hamburg-Nord. He was first elected to the Hamburgische Bürgerschaft in the 2008 state elections. From 2008 until 2011 he served on the Budget Committee. In addition, he led a parliamentary inquiry into cost overruns in the construction of the Elbphilharmonie from 2010.

=== Finance Senator, 2011–2018 ===
During his tenure as State Minister of Finance Tschentscher oversaw the privatization of the publicly owned shipping finance provider HSH Nordbank.

From 2015 on, Tschentscher was one of the state's representatives at the Bundesrat, where he served as deputy chairman of the finance committee.

=== First mayor of Hamburg, 2018–present ===
In March 2018 Tschentscher succeeded Olaf Scholz, who left state politics to become Federal Minister of Finance and Vice Chancellor of Germany in the fourth coalition government of Chancellor Angela Merkel.

At the time of his nomination, Tschentscher was seen as a surprising choice by many, as he has not appeared much in the public during his term as Senator of Finance. Andreas Dressel, SPD parliamentary group leader in Hamburg, had been considered by many as obvious successor of Scholz, but declined for personal reasons.

As one of the state's representatives at the Bundesrat, Tschentscher is a member of the Committee on Foreign Affairs and on the Committee on European Affairs. He is also a member of the German-Polish Friendship Group set up in cooperation with the Senate of Poland. During his first year as mayor, he served as Commissioner of the Federal Republic of Germany for Cultural Affairs under the Treaty on Franco-German Cooperation.

In the negotiations to form a so-called traffic light coalition of the SPD, the Green Party and the Free Democratic Party (FDP) following the 2021 federal elections, Tschentscher was part of his party's delegation in the working group on economic affairs, co-chaired by Carsten Schneider, Cem Özdemir and Michael Theurer.

Tschentscher was nominated by his party as delegate to the Federal Convention for the purpose of electing the President of Germany in 2022.

After the 2025 Hamburg state election, the third Tschentscher senate was formed.

== Other activities ==
=== Corporate boards ===
- HafenCity Hamburg GmbH, ex officio chairman of the supervisory board (since 2018)

=== Non-profit organizations ===
- Business Forum of the Social Democratic Party of Germany, Member of the Political Advisory Board (since 2020)
- Stability Council, ex officio member
- Haus Rissen, Member of the Board of Trustees
- Deutsches Museum, Member of the Board of Trustees

Political offices
Preceded by Olaf Scholz	First Mayor of Hamburg; 2018–present	Incumbent
Preceded by Bodo Ramelow	President of the Bundesrat; 2022–2023	Succeeded by Manuela Schwesig
