= CDU Hamburg =

Regional state association of the CDU in Hamburg, Germany

CDU Hamburg Hamburger CDU
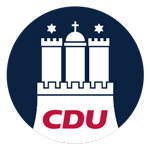
- Chairperson: Dennis Thering
- Founded: 1 October 1945; 80 years ago
- Headquarters: Ludwig-Erhard-Haus; Leinpfad 74 22299; Hamburg
- Membership (2020): 6,474
- Ideology: Christian democracy Liberal conservatism Pro-Europeanism
- Political position: Centre-right
- National affiliation: Christian Democratic Union
- Colours: Black
- Hamburg Parliament: 26 / 123
- Bundestag delegation: 3 / 16

Website
- cduhamburg.de

The CDU Hamburg is the regional state association of the Christian Democratic Union of Germany (CDU) in Hamburg, Germany. As of 2019, there are about 6,474 members in the association, about 40 percent are women. In 1946, from 1953 to 1957 and from 2001 to 2011, the party appointed the First Mayor of Hamburg. The CDU Hamburg has been part of the opposition since 2011. Seven district associations and 47 local associations form the basis for the political commitment of the CDU Hamburg.

In 2020, two-time member of the Bundestag Christoph Ploß had been elected as chairman of the party. Ploß stepped down in April 2023 and passed the chairmanship to Dennis Thering.

== History ==
=== 2011 state election ===
In the early state election in 2011, former First Mayor Christoph Ahlhaus (CDU) had to admit defeat to his challenger Olaf Scholz (SPD). Compared to the 2008 election, the CDU Hamburg had lost almost half their voters and received their worst result of all time, while the Social Democrats achieved the absolute majority of the parliamentary mandates. After the election results, then chairman Frank Schira announced his resignation. Marcus Weinberg succeeded him as chairman in 2011.

=== 2015 state election ===
The frontrunner for the 2015 Hamburg state election was parliamentary group leader Dietrich Wersich. With 15.9% of the state vote lists, the CDU Hamburg fell to a new historic low and thus only appointed 20 of 121 members of the 21st Hamburg Parliament. The CDU won at least one direct mandate in all 17 constituencies, as well as two in the Alstertal-Walddorfer constituency. Just like in the 2013 federal election, the Alstertal-Walddörfer, Süderelbe and Bergedorf constituencies remained the strongholds of the CDU Hamburg. After the state election, Marcus Weinberg announced his resignation as state chairman. On 31 March 2015, Roland Heintze was elected as his successor.

=== 2020 state election ===
In the 2020 Hamburg state election, the CDU lost around a third of its share of votes and, at 11.2%, had to accept its second-lowest result in a state election since the party's founding 68 years prior - the worst result being 9% in the 1951 Bremen state election. The then front runner and member of the Bundestag Marcus Weinberg, the former front runner Dietrich Wersich, then chairman Roland Heintze and chairman of the Hamburg Young Union Philipp Heißner also missed the entry into the Hamburg Parliament. Since 15 direct mandates were won in both the constituencies as well as for the party itself, only 15 seats in the Hamburg Parliament were given to the CDU.

== Chairmen of the state association ==
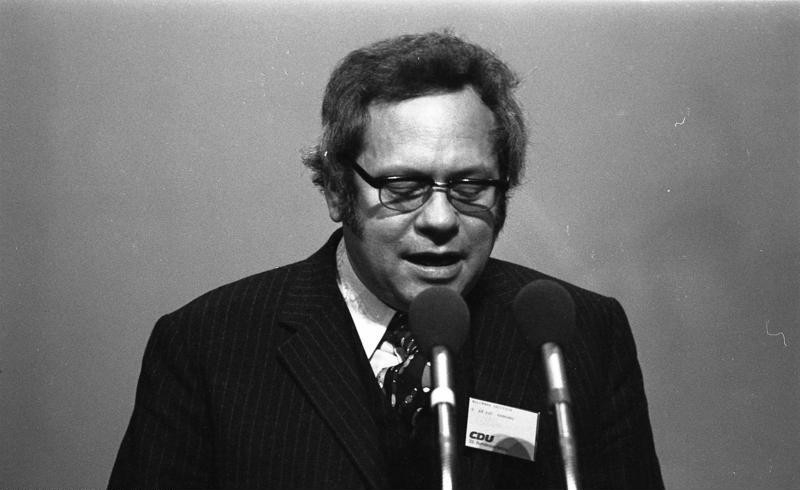
Former chairman Dietrich Rollmann at the CDU's federal party convent in 1973

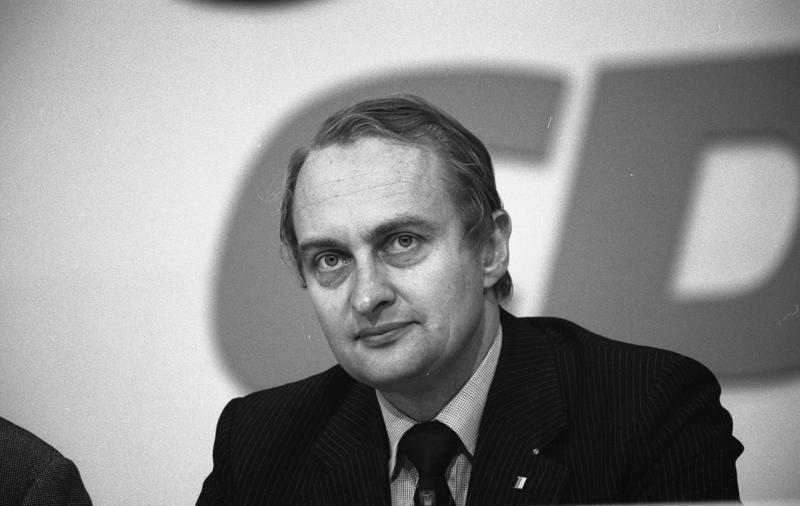
Former chairman Jürgen Echternach at the party's federal convent in 1978

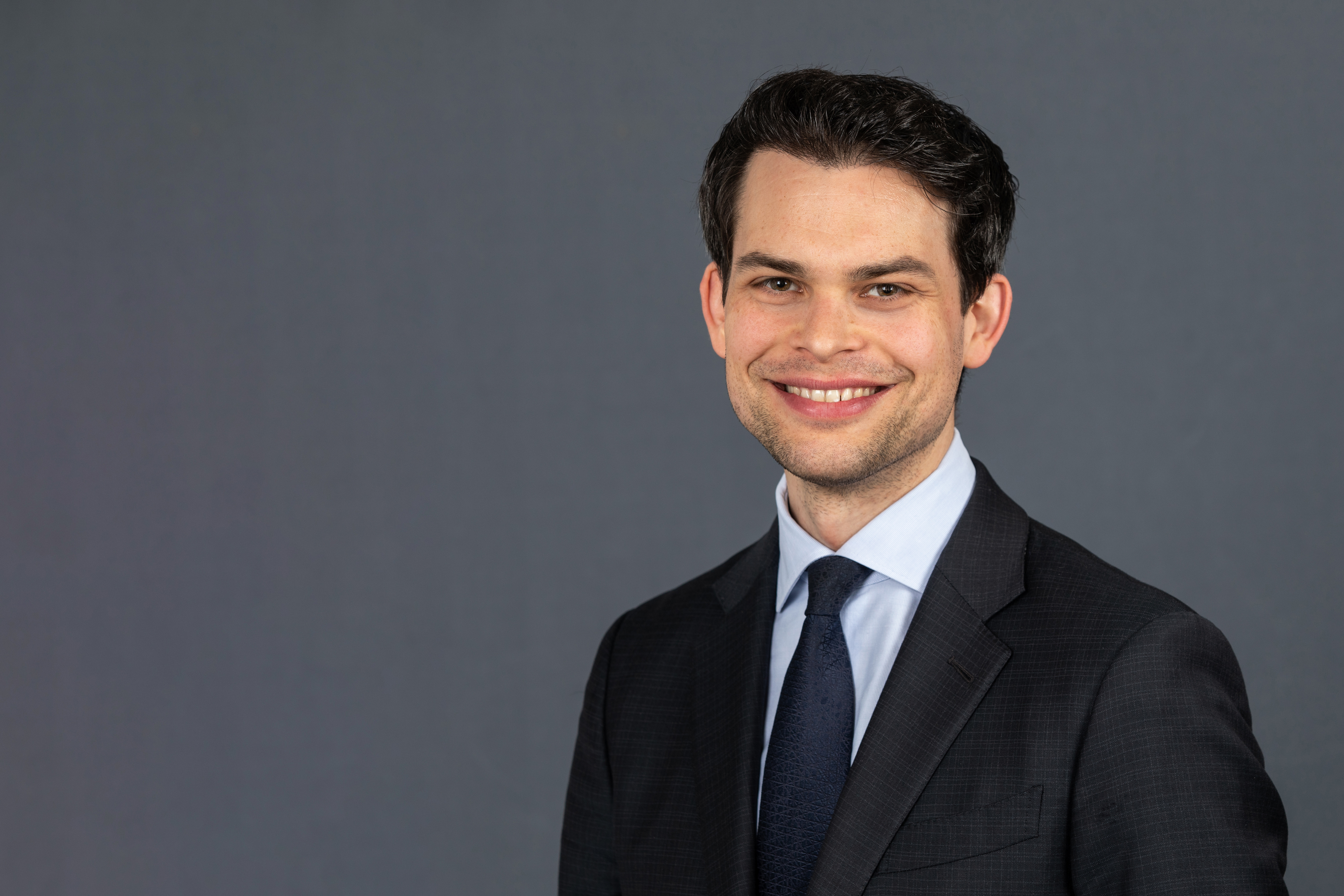
Former chairman Christoph Ploß

On October 1, 1945, Franz Beyrich was elected as the party's first chairman. Beyrich, who belonged to the Roman Catholic minority in Hamburg, had been a government employee until the National Socialists came to power. Dismissed by the Nazi regime, he changed fields to work in the private sector. After the 20 July plot, Beyrich was arrested and imprisoned in the Fuhlsbüttel concentration camp.

=== Complete list of chairmen ===
Year	Chairman
1945 (Oct./Nov.)	Franz Beyrich
1945 (Nov.)	Johannes Speckbötel
1945–1946	Otto Wilhelm Wendt
1946–1948	Max Ketels
1948–1954	Hugo Scharnberg
1954–1956	Josef von Fisenne
1956–1958	Hugo Scharnberg
1958–1968	Erik Blumenfeld
1968–1973	Dietrich Rollmann
1974–1992	Jürgen Echternach
1992–2007	Dirk Fischer
2007–2010	Michael Freytag
2010–2011	Frank Schira
2010–2015	Marcus Weinberg
2015–2020	Roland Heintze
2020-2023	Christoph Ploß
since 2023	Dennis Thering

== State Parliament ==
There are 15 members in the CDU parliamentary group in the Hamburg Parliament.

=== Chair ===
The board of the CDU parliamentary group consists of nine members:

- Dennis Thering, chairman of the CDU parliamentary group
- Anke Frieling, deputy parliamentary group leader
- Richard Seelmaecker, deputy parliamentary group leader
- Dennis Gladiator, Parliamentary Secretary
- David Erkalp, assessor
- Götz T. Wiese, assessor
- Silke Seif, assessor
- Thilo Kleibauer, party representative in the Hamburg Parliament Budget Committee, member by virtue of office
- André Trepoll, Vice President of the Hamburg Parliament, member by virtue of office

=== Other members ===
Birgit Stöver, Eckard H. Graage, Andreas Grutzeck, Sandro Kappe, Ralf Niedmers, Stephan A. Gamm, Anna-Elisabeth von Treuenfels-Frowein.

== Election results ==
=== Bürgerschaft of Hamburg ===
Election	Popular Vote		Seats	+/–	Government
Election	Votes	%	Seats	+/–	Government
1946	749,153	26.7 (#2)	16 / 110		Opposition
1949	272,649	34.5 (#2)	40 / 120	As VBH	Opposition
1953	504,084	50.0 (#1)	62 / 120	As HB	Majority
1957	330,991	32.2 (#2)	41 / 120	As CDU	Opposition
1961	287,619	29.1 (#2)	36 / 120	▼5	Opposition
1966	284,501	30.0 (#2)	38 / 120	▲2	Opposition
1970	329,337	32.8 (#2)	41 / 120	▲3	Opposition
1974	423,912	40.6 (#2)	51 / 120	▲10	Opposition
1978	360,409	37.6 (#2)	51 / 120	0	Opposition
1982-06	413,361	43.2 (#1)	56 / 120	▲5	Opposition
1982-12	398,518	38.6 (#2)	48 / 120	▼8	Opposition
1986	402,081	41.9 (#1)	54 / 120	▲6	Opposition
1987	398,686	40.5 (#2)	49 / 120	▼5	Opposition
1991	287,467	35.1 (#2)	44 / 121	▼5	Opposition
1993	212,186	25.1 (#2)	36 / 121	▼8	Opposition
1997	252,640	30.7 (#2)	46 / 121	▲10	Opposition
2001	223,015	26.2 (#2)	33 / 121	▼13	CDU-Schill-FDP
2004	389,170	47.2 (#1)	63 / 121	▲30	Majority
2008	331,067	42.6 (#1)	56 / 121	▼7	CDU-Greens
2011	753,805	21.9 (#2)	28 / 121	▼28	Opposition
2015	561,377	15.9 (#2)	20 / 121	▼8	Opposition
2020	452,372	11.2 (#3)	15 / 123	▼5	Opposition
2025	864,700	19.8 (#2)	26 / 123	▲11	Opposition
