= Moorfleet =

- Quarter of Hamburg
- Interactive map of Moorfleet
- Location within Germany Location within Hamburg
- Coordinates: 53°30′15″N 10°5′7″E
- Country: Germany
- State: Hamburg
- City: Hamburg
- Borough: Bergedorf

Area
  - Total: 4.3 km^{2} (1.7 sq mi)

Population (2024-12-31)
  - Total: 1,203
  - Density: 280/km^{2} (720/sq mi)
- Time zone: UTC+01:00 (CET)
  - Summer (DST): UTC+02:00 (CEST)
- Dialling codes: 040
- Vehicle registration: HH

Moorfleet (German pronunciation: [moːɐ̯ˈfleːt]) is a quarter of Hamburg, Germany, in the borough of Bergedorf. It is located in the west of the borough.

== Geography ==
Moorfleet is a part of the Marschlande and is located along the Dove Elbe river. The quarter is not highly populated and is mainly used for agriculture. However, the western part of Moorfleet is a part of the industrial area of the Port of Hamburg.

Moorfleet borders the quarters Allermöhe, Tatenberg, Spadenland, Billwerder, Billbrook and Rothenburgsort.

== Politics ==
These are the results of Moorfleet in the Hamburg state election in 2015:

- SPD 47.8% (− 0.6)
- CDU 19.5% (− 7.5)
- AfD 11.4% (+ 11.4)
- FDP 6.6% (+ 0.8)
- The Left 5.5% (+ 0.2)
- The Greens 5.2% (− 0.8)
- Others 3.6% (– 3.5)

== Transportation ==
Moorfleet has no S-Bahn or U-Bahn station. However the Billwerder-Moorfleet station in Billbrook is nearby.
