= Hamburg-Nord (electoral district) =

Federal electoral district of Germany

21 Hamburg-Nord
- Electoral district for the Bundestag
- Hamburg-Nord in 2025
- State: Hamburg
- Population: 289,200 (2019)
- Electorate: 219,909 (2021)
- Area: 115.0 km^{2}

Current electoral district
- Created: 1980
- Party: CDU
- Member: Christoph Ploß
- Elected: 2025

Hamburg-Nord is an electoral constituency (German: Wahlkreis) represented in the Bundestag. It elects one member via first-past-the-post voting. Under the current constituency numbering system, it is designated as constituency 21. It is located in northern Hamburg, comprising most of the Hamburg-Nord borough and the northern part of the Wandsbek borough.

Hamburg-Nord was created for the 1980 federal election. From 2021 to 2025, it was represented by Dorothee Martin of the Social Democratic Party (SPD). Since 2025 it has been represented by Christoph Ploß of the CDU.

== Geography ==
Hamburg-Nord is located in northern Hamburg. As of the 2021 federal election, it comprises the entirety of the Hamburg-Nord borough with the exception of the quarters of Barmbek-Nord, Barmbek-Süd, Dulsberg, Hohenfelde, and Uhlenhorst. It also contains the quarters of Bergstedt, Duvenstedt, Hummelsbüttel, Lemsahl-Mellingstedt, Poppenbüttel, Sasel, Wellingsbüttel and Wohldorf-Ohlstedt from the Wandsbek borough.

== History ==
Hamburg-Nord was created in 1980 and contained parts of the abolished constituencies of Hamburg-Nord I and Hamburg-Nord II. Through the 1998 election, it was constituency number 15 in the numbering system. From 2002 through 2009, it was constituency 22; since 2013, it has been constituency 21. Its borders have not changed since its creation.

== Members ==
The constituency was held by the Social Democratic Party (SPD) from its creation in 1980 until 1987, during which time it was represented by Hans Apel. It was won by the Christian Democratic Union (CDU) in 1987, and represented by Dirk Fischer. In 1998, it was won by the SPD's Anke Hartnagel. She was succeeded by Christian Carstensen in 2005. Former member Fischer won the constituency again in 2009. He was succeeded by Christoph Ploß in the 2017 election. Dorothee Martin regained it for the SPD in 2021.

Election	Member	Party	%
1980	Hans Apel	SPD	49.7
1983	Hans Apel	SPD	45.7
1987	Dirk Fischer	CDU	42.8
1990	Dirk Fischer	CDU	41.6
1994	Dirk Fischer	CDU	40.9
1998	Anke Hartnagel	SPD	47.1
2002	Anke Hartnagel	SPD	48.4
2005	Christian Carstensen	SPD	43.3
2009	Dirk Fischer	CDU	38.4
2013	Dirk Fischer	CDU	39.7
2017	Christoph Ploß	CDU	33.5
2021	Dorothee Martin	SPD	30.7
2025	Christoph Ploß	CDU	28.1

== Election results ==
=== 2025 election ===
Federal election (2025): Hamburg-Nord
Notes:	Blue background denotes the winner of the electorate vote. Pink background denotes a candidate elected from their party list. Yellow background denotes an electorate win by a list member, or other incumbent. A ✓ or ✗ denotes status of any incumbent, win or lose respectively.						
Party	Candidate	Votes	%	±%	Party votes	%	±%
CDU	Christoph Ploß	53,094	28.1	▲4.3	49,436	26.1	▲7.5
SPD	✗ Dorothee Martin	50,336	26.6	▼4.1	42,685	22.5	▼5.4
Greens	Katharina Beck	42,876	22.7	▼3.0	39,931	21.1	▼4.1
AfD	Eckbert Sachse	15,266	8.1	▲4.7	15,782	8.3	▲4.6
Left	Rachid Messaoudi	14,915	7.9	▲3.0	19,315	10.2	▲5.5
FDP	Robert Bläsing	7,028	3.7	▼4.9	11,090	5.9	▼8.4
BSW					5,700	3.0	New
Volt	Petra Engelking	4,175	2.2	New	2,635	1.4	▲0.9
Tierschutzpartei					1,492	0.8	▼0.2
PARTEI					624	0.3	▼0.5
FW	Dominik Tobaben	1,376	0.7	▼0.1	590	0.3	▼0.2
BD					179	0.1	New
MLPD					46	<0.1	0.0
Informal votes		1,167			728		
Total valid votes		189,066			189,505		
Turnout		190,233	85.6	▲1.3			
CDU gain from SPD	Majority	2,758	1.5	N/A			

=== 2021 election ===
Federal election (2021): Hamburg-Nord
Notes:	Blue background denotes the winner of the electorate vote. Pink background denotes a candidate elected from their party list. Yellow background denotes an electorate win by a list member, or other incumbent. A ✓ or ✗ denotes status of any incumbent, win or lose respectively.						
Party	Candidate	Votes	%	±%	Party votes	%	±%
SPD	Dorothee Martin	56,594	30.7	▼0.1	51,575	27.9	▲6.5
Greens	Katharina Beck	47,375	25.7	▲12.1	46,531	25.2	▲10.8
CDU	✗ Christoph Ploß	43,870	23.8	▼9.7	34,387	18.6	▼12.7
FDP	Robert Bläsing	15,786	8.6	▲0.2	26,247	14.2	▲0.4
Left	Deniz Celik	9,095	4.9	▼2.5	8,741	4.7	▼4.7
AfD	Benjamin Mennerich	6,259	3.4	▼2.1	6,811	3.7	▼2.5
dieBasis	Jörn Böttcher	3,258	1.8		2,535	1.4	
Tierschutzpartei					1,893	1.0	▲0.3
PARTEI					1,443	0.8	▼0.4
Volt					948	0.5	
FW	Almut Becker	1,540	0.8	▲0.1	939	0.5	▲0.2
Team Todenhöfer					875	0.5	
Pirates					606	0.3	
ÖDP					292	0.2	0.0
V-Partei3					220	0.1	▼0.1
Humanists					182	0.1	
du.					150	0.1	
LKR	Steffan Nethe	179	0.1		64	0.0	
MLPD	Susanne Bader	174	0.1		48	0.0	0.0
NPD	Ingo Stawitz	93	0.0		79	0.0	▼0.1
DKP					72	0.0	0.0
Bündnis 21					53	0.0	
Informal votes		1,234			766		
Total valid votes		184,223			184,691		
Turnout		185,457	84.3	▲2.0			
SPD gain from CDU	Majority	9,219	5.0				

=== 2017 election ===
Federal election (2017): Hamburg-Nord
Notes:	Blue background denotes the winner of the electorate vote. Pink background denotes a candidate elected from their party list. Yellow background denotes an electorate win by a list member, or other incumbent. A ✓ or ✗ denotes status of any incumbent, win or lose respectively.						
Party	Candidate	Votes	%	±%	Party votes	%	±%
CDU	Christoph Ploß	59,441	33.5	▼6.2	55,737	31.3	▼5.1
SPD	Dorothee Martin (Note: Martin entered the Bundestag on the SPD list after the resignation of Johannes Kahrs in May 2020.)	54,695	30.8	▼3.9	38,150	21.4	▼8.7
Greens	Anja Hajduk	24,065	13.6	▲1.6	25,584	14.4	▲1.9
FDP	Robert Bläsing	14,911	8.4	▲6.0	24,652	13.9	▲7.6
Left	Rainer Behrens	13,277	7.5	▲2.8	16,720	9.4	▲2.9
AfD	Delphine Thiermann	9,701	5.5	▲2.0	10,963	6.2	▲2.0
PARTEI					2,042	1.1	▲0.7
FW	Jens Rohde	1,273	0.7		556	0.3	▲0.1
Tierschutzpartei					1,245	0.7	
DiB					630	0.4	
BGE					579	0.3	
V-Partei³					361	0.2	
ÖDP					340	0.2	0.0
NPD					180	0.1	▼0.3
DKP					72	0.0	
MLPD					63	0.0	0.0
Informal votes		1,397			886		
Total valid votes		177,363			177,874		
Turnout		178,760	82.3	▲4.9			
CDU hold	Majority	4,746	2.7	▼2.2			

=== 2013 election ===
Federal election (2013): Hamburg-Nord
Notes:	Blue background denotes the winner of the electorate vote. Pink background denotes a candidate elected from their party list. Yellow background denotes an electorate win by a list member, or other incumbent. A ✓ or ✗ denotes status of any incumbent, win or lose respectively.						
Party	Candidate	Votes	%	±%	Party votes	%	±%
CDU	✓ Dirk Fischer	64,459	39.7	▲1.3	59,244	36.5	▲5.4
SPD	Christian Carstensen	56,421	34.7	▲1.6	49,039	30.2	▲4.9
Greens	Anja Hajduk	19,343	11.9	▼1.3	20,357	12.5	▼3.7
Left	Herbert Schulz	7,626	4.7	▼2.0	10,615	6.5	▼1.8
AfD	Jörn Kruse	5,708	3.5		6,721	4.1	
FDP	Sylvia Canel	3,921	2.4	▼5.5	10,242	6.3	▼9.3
Pirates	Sebastian Seeger	3,559	2.2		3,638	2.2	▲0.2
PARTEI					681	0.4	
FW	Kai Connelly	637	0.4		392	0.2	
NPD	Helmut Dörlitz	610	0.4	▼0.3	588	0.4	▼0.1
RENTNER					585	0.4	▼0.2
ÖDP					297	0.2	▼0.1
MLPD					39	0.0	0.0
Informal votes		1,666			1,512		
Total valid votes		162,284			162,438		
Turnout		163,950	77.4	▼1.3			
CDU hold	Majority	8,038	4.9	▼0.3			

=== 2009 election ===
Federal election (2009): Hamburg-Nord
Notes:	Blue background denotes the winner of the electorate vote. Pink background denotes a candidate elected from their party list. Yellow background denotes an electorate win by a list member, or other incumbent. A ✓ or ✗ denotes status of any incumbent, win or lose respectively.						
Party	Candidate	Votes	%	±%	Party votes	%	±%
CDU	Dirk Fischer	61,873	34.3	▼1.1	50,174	31.0	▼1.2
SPD	✗ Christian Carstensen	53,469	33.2	▼10.1	40,909	25.3	▼9.8
Greens	Petra Osinski	21,268	13.2	▲3.5	26,306	16.3	▲0.6
FDP	Robert Bläsing	12,766	7.9	▲4.3	25,269	15.6	▲4.8
Left	Vera Niazi-Shahabi	10,805	6.7	▲3.3	13,429	8.3	▲3.5
Pirates					3,289	2.0	
NPD	Lothar Baseler	1,010	0.6	0.0	794	0.5	▼0.1
RENTNER					876	0.5	
ÖDP					411	0.3	
DVU					152	0.1	
MLPD					46	0.0	0.0
Informal votes		1,821			1,357		
Total valid votes		161,191			151,655		
Turnout		163,012	78.7	▼4.2			
CDU gain from SPD	Majority	8,404	5.2				

=== 2005 election ===
Federal election (2005):Hamburg-Nord
Notes:	Blue background denotes the winner of the electorate vote. Pink background denotes a candidate elected from their party list. Yellow background denotes an electorate win by a list member, or other incumbent. A ✓ or ✗ denotes status of any incumbent, win or lose respectively.						
Party	Candidate	Votes	%	±%	Party votes	%	±%
SPD	Christian Carstensen	72,148	43.3	▼5.2	58,596	35.1	▼3.4
CDU	Dirk Fischer	65,788	39.4	▲3.5	53,812	32.2	▲1.4
Greens	Anja Hajduk	16,177	9.7	▲0.8	26,143	15.7	▼1.9
FDP	Stephanie Iraschko-Luscher	6,003	3.6	▼1.3	18,089	10.8	▲2.6
Left	Antje Wefing	5,602	3.4	▲2.2	7,951	4.8	▲3.1
NPD	Jan Zimmermann	1,053	0.6		979	0.6	▲0.5
Tierschutzpartei					945	0.6	
PARTEI					271	0.2	
APPD					161	0.1	
MLPD					46	0.0	
Informal votes		1,581			1,359		
Total valid votes		166,771			166,993		
Turnout		168,352	82.9	▼1.6			
SPD hold	Majority	6,360	3.9				
