= Dorothee Martin =

German politician

- Martin in 2021

Member of the Bundestag
- In office 11 May 2020 – 25 March 2025
- Preceded by: Johannes Kahrs
- Succeeded by: Christoph Ploß
- Constituency: Hamburg-Mitte (2020–2021); Hamburg-Nord (2021–2025)

Member of the Hamburg Parliament; for Fuhlsbüttel – Alsterdorf – Langenhorn
- In office 7 March 2011 – 28 May 2020
- Preceded by: Multi-member district
- Succeeded by: Clarissa Herbst

Personal details
- Born: Dorothee Katja Julia Martin; 21 January 1978 (age 48) Kaiserslautern, West Germany
- Party: Social Democratic
- Education: University of Hamburg

Dorothee Martin (born 21 January 1978) is a German politician for the Social Democratic Party (SPD) who has been serving as a member of the Bundestag from 2020 to 2025, representing the Hamburg-Nord district.

== Early life and education ==
Martin was born 1978 in the West German town of Kaiserslautern and studied political sciences and law at the University of Hamburg.

== Political career ==
Martin entered the SPD in 1998 and was from 2011 to 2020 a member of the Hamburg Parliament, the unicameral legislature of the federal city state of Hamburg.

In May 2020 Martin was the replacement after the recession of Johannes Kahrs as member of the Bundestag. She was elected in the constituency of Hamburg-Nord at the 2021 German federal election.

Since the 2021 elections, Martin has been serving as her parliamentary group’s spokesperson for transport.

== Other activities ==
- Deutsche Bahn, Member of the Supervisory Board (since 2022)
- Federal Network Agency for Electricity, Gas, Telecommunications, Posts and Railway (BNetzA), Alternate Member of the Rail Infrastructure Advisory Council (since 2022)
