= Christian Carstensen =

German politician

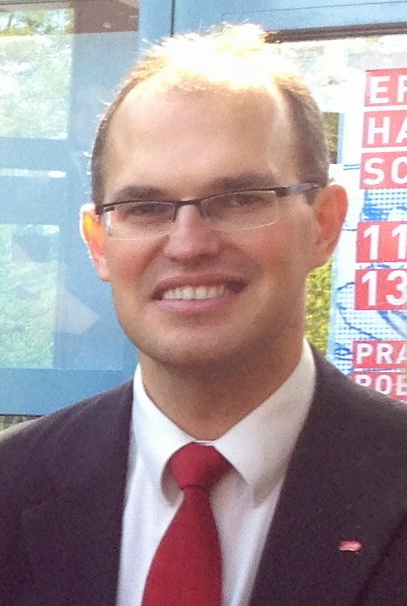
- Carstensen in 2013

Member of the Bundestag; for Hamburg-Nord
- In office 18 October 2005 – 27 October 2009
- Preceded by: Anke Hartnagel
- Succeeded by: Dirk Fischer

Personal details
- Born: 11 March 1973 (age 53) Hamburg, West Germany
- Party: Social Democratic
- Children: 2
- Education: Hamburg University of Economy and Politics

Christian Carstensen (born 11 March 1973) is a German politician and member of the Social Democratic Party (SPD). He was a member of the Hamburg-Nord district parliament (Bezirksversammlung) from 2001 to 2005. In 2005 he was elected to the Bundestag, the German federal parliament, representing Hamburg-Nord, however he lost his seat at the 2009 election.
