= Tatenberg =

- Quarter of Hamburg
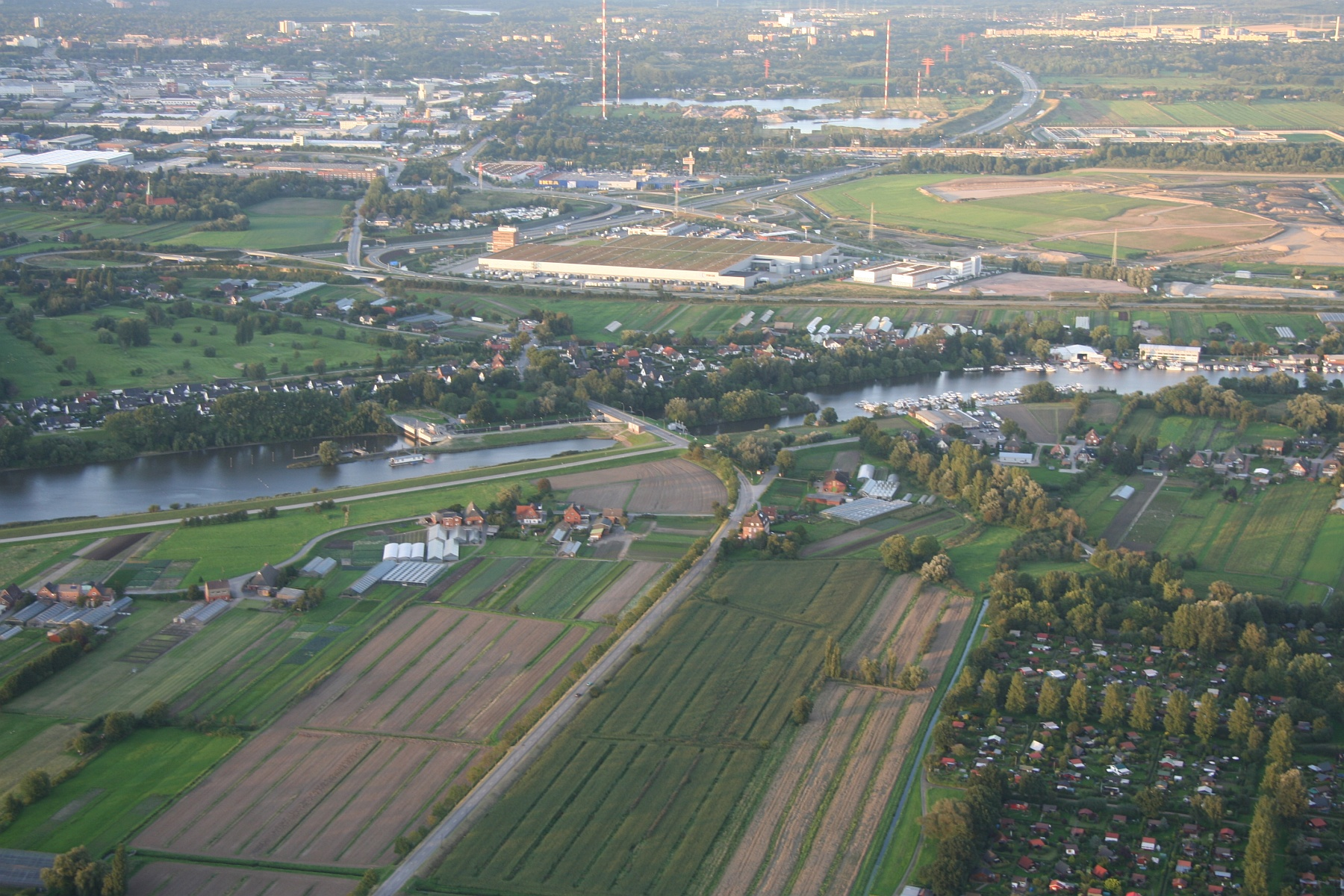
- The Tatenberg Lock
- Interactive map of Tatenberg
- Location within Germany Location within Hamburg
- Coordinates: 53°29′0″N 10°5′0″E
- Country: Germany
- State: Hamburg
- City: Hamburg
- Borough: Bergedorf

Area
  - Total: 3.1 km^{2} (1.2 sq mi)

Population (2024-12-31)
  - Total: 560
  - Density: 180/km^{2} (470/sq mi)
- Time zone: UTC+01:00 (CET)
  - Summer (DST): UTC+02:00 (CEST)
- Dialling codes: 040
- Vehicle registration: HH

Tatenberg (German pronunciation: [ˈtaːtn̩bɛʁk]) is a quarter in Hamburg, Germany, in the borough of Bergedorf. In 2020 the population was 564.

== Geography ==
Tatenberg borders the quarters Spadenland, Ochsenwerder, Moorfleet, Rothenburgsort and Allermöhe. It is located at the Dove Elbe.

== Politics ==
These are the results of Tatenberg in the Hamburg state election:

State Election	SPD	CDU	Greens	Left	AfD	FDP	Others
2020	39,0 %	21,5 %	18,4 %	8,1 %	4,6 %	3,4 %	5,0 %
2015	44,1 %	28,7 %	7,1 %	9,2 %	4,7 %	2,7 %	3,5 %
2011	36,5 %	39,4 %	12,7 %	5,7 %	–	2,5 %	3,2 %
2008	23,3 %	56,7 %	6,5 %	6,7 %	–	3,7 %	3,3 %

Tatenberg and Spadenland were the only quarters where the CDU won the majority of the votes in the Hamburg state election in 2011. However the CDU also lost these two quarters in the Hamburg state election in 2015 and the SPD became the most popular party in these quarters as well.

== Transport ==
Tatenberg has no S-Bahn or U-Bahn station but four different bus lines.
