= Bilbrook =

Bilbrook may refer to:

- Bilbrook, Somerset
- Bilbrook, Staffordshire

== See also ==
- Billbrook, Hamburg, Germany
