= Anke Hartnagel =

German politician (1942–2004)

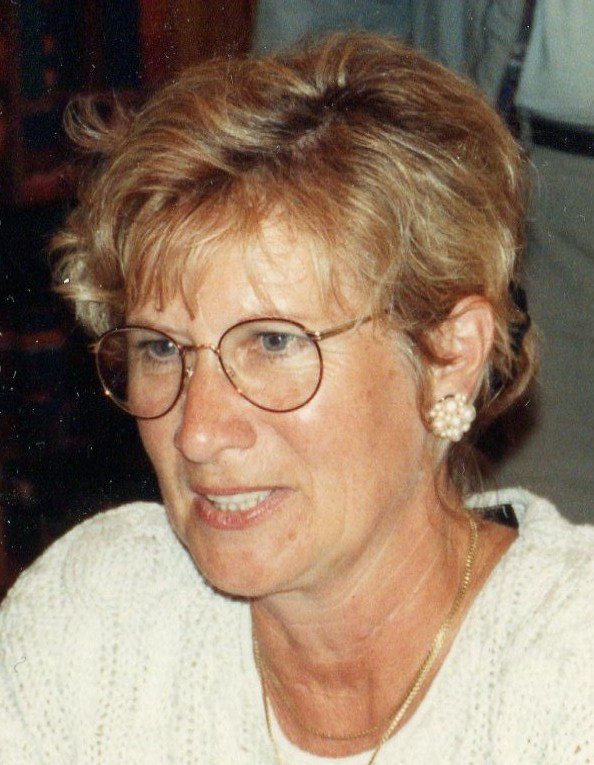

Member of the Bundestag; for Hamburg-Nord
- In office 26 October 1998 – 17 April 2004
- Preceded by: Dirk Fischer
- Succeeded by: Christian Carstensen

Personal details
- Born: Anke Thomsen; 22 January 1942 Berlin, Germany
- Died: 17 April 2004 (aged 62) Hamburg, Germany
- Resting place: Ohlsdorf Cemetery
- Party: Social Democratic

Anke Hartnagel (née Thomsen; 22 January 1942 – 17 April 2004) was a German politician from the Social Democratic Party.

She was Member of the Bundestag for Hamburg-Nord from 1998 to her death in 2004.
