= Frowein =

Frowein is a surname of German origin.

== List of people with the surname ==
- Anna-Elisabeth von Treuenfels-Frowein (born 1962), German politician
- Eberhard Frowein (1881–1964), German screenwriter and film director

== See also ==
- Frowin
