= Dennis Thering =

German politician (born 1984)

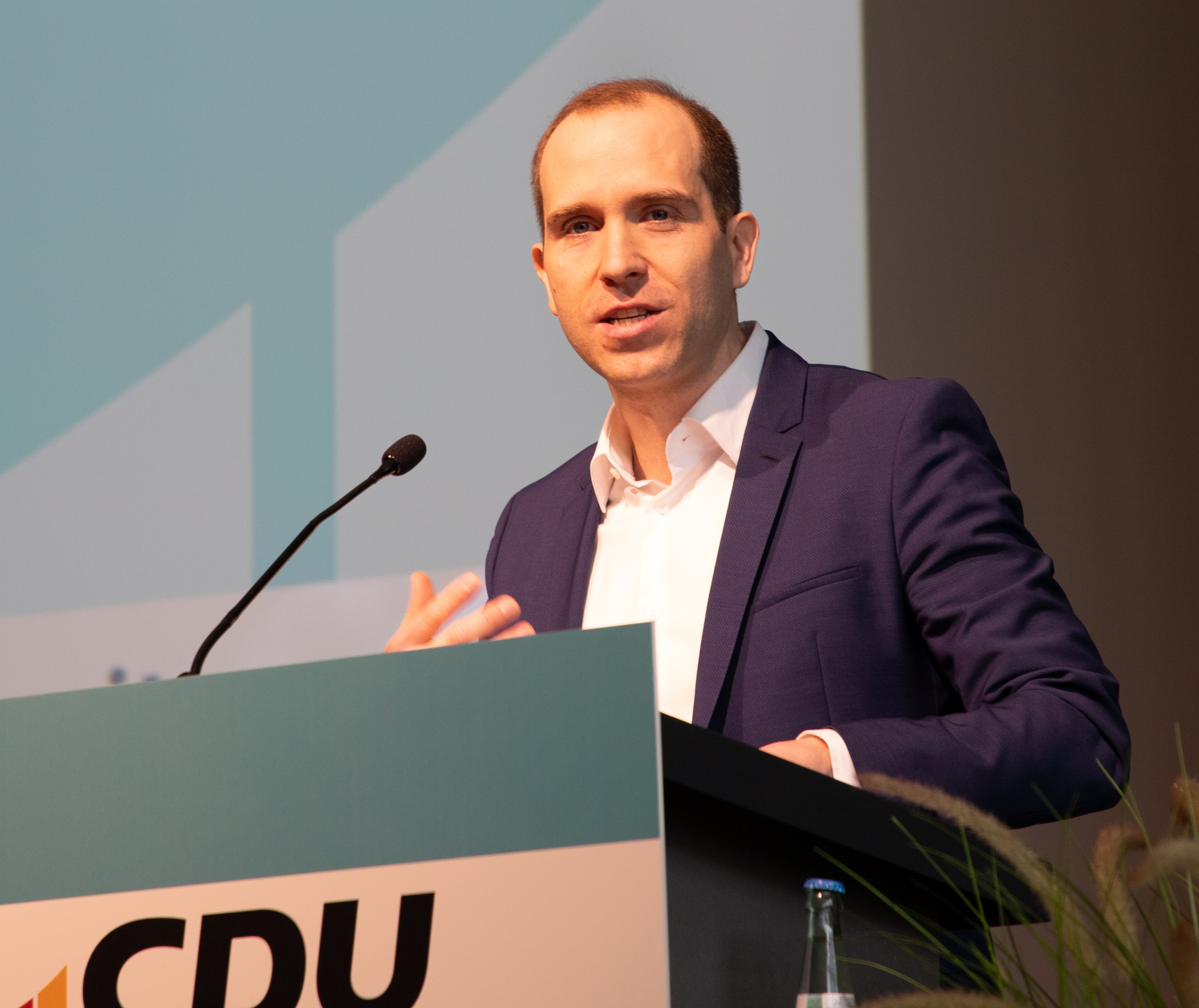
- Thering in 2024

Chairman of the Christian Democratic Union of Hamburg
- Incumbent
- Assumed office 3 April 2023
- Preceded by: Christoph Ploß

Member of the Hamburg Parliament
- Incumbent
- Assumed office 20 February 2011

Personal details
- Born: 5 April 1984 (age 42) Hamburg, West Germany
- Party: CDU (since 2001)
- Education: University of Hamburg

Dennis Thering (born 5 April 1984) is a German politician of the Christian Democratic Union of Germany (CDU) and chairman of the CDU parliamentary group in the Hamburg Parliament. He has been a member of the Hamburg Parliament since 2011 and has been chairman of the parliamentary opposition since the 2020 elections. In April 2023, he became chairman of the CDU Hamburg.

== Education and professional career ==
Dennis Thering graduated from the Wirtschaftsgymnasium City Nord, a secondary school in Hamburg with a focus on economics, in 2003. After graduating, he spent one year doing community service at the Hospital zum Heiligen Geist ("Holy Spirit Hospital") in the Poppenbüttel quarter of Hamburg. Thering then completed an apprenticeship as a bank clerk at the German public savings bank Hamburger Sparkasse in 2006, where he then worked for four years. In 2010, he went back to school to study political science - he eventually earned his BA degree at the University of Hamburg in 2013. From January 2014 to March 2020, Thering was employed as an executive assistant at the care services provider Pflegen & Wohnen Hamburg GmbH.

== Political career ==
=== Local affairs ===
Dennis Thering has been a member of the CDU since 2001. He acts both as chairman of the CDU in Alstertal and as district chairman of the CDU Wandsbek. Between 2004 and 2008, he was a member of the local committee Alstertal where he was appointed deputy group leader. From 2008 to 2011, Thering was a directly elected member of the Alstertal-Walddoerfer constituency for the Wandsbek district assembly. During this time, he was the spokesperson for the Alstertal region as well as the representative of the sports department of the CDU Wandsbek parliamentary group.

=== State parliament ===
Thering has been both a member of the Hamburg Parliament and a member of the state board of the CDU Hamburg since 2011. In the 2015 state elections, Thering was reelected into the state parliament via a direct mandate in the Alstertal-Walddörfer constituency. He was deputy chairman of the CDU parliamentary group until spring of 2020: At its constituent parliamentary group meeting on March 18, 2020, the CDU parliamentary group unanimously elected Thering as their new chairman.

In the general election on February 23, 2020, Thering was once again appointed as the top candidate of the CDU Hamburg in the Alstertal-Walddörfer constituency. On February 23, 2020, he - for the third time - was reelected as a member of the Hamburg Parliament

In April 2023, the previous chairman of the CDU Hamburg Christoph Ploß stepped down and handed over the chairmanship to Thering, who was elected by the party members with 185 out of 197 votes. Eight delegates voted against him, four abstained.

=== Political positions ===
Thering focuses on transport policy, internal security and economic policy. The CDU does not want to "exclude" any road users, stands firmly by the Port of Hamburg and wants to contribute more to the safety of Hamburg's citizens, he stated. Improving health care is also important to him, Thering said.

He, alongside the CDU Hamburg, supported the initiative "Put an end to gender language in administration and education" in February 2023.

Thering distances himself from the far right, stating in February 2023: "The AfD is an openly racist party, in part also anti-Semitic, so we clearly distance ourselves."

=== Candidacy for mayor ===
On 24 February 2023, Thering announced his candidacy to run as a candidate to challenge Hamburg's First Mayor Peter Tschentscher (SPD) in the 2025 election for the 23rd Hamburg Parliament, stating in the Hamburger Abendblatt Summer Interview of 2022: "Government responsibility does not mean that we then automatically provide the next mayor." Thering's mayoral candidacy is viewed controversially. Party researcher Elmar Wiesendahl commented in an interview on 25 June 2022 that ‘the plan of parliamentary group leader Dennis Thering to lead the party into the election is a subscription to defeat’ and pleaded for "a prominent newcomer, like Walther Leisler Kiep once did" in order to "connect with Hamburg's business circles".

In July 2024, NDR saw Thering as the "new strong man in the CDU. Young, adaptable, rhetorically fit, but also a bit conservative". On 20 August 2024, Thering was unanimously nominated by the CDU state executive as his party's top candidate for the upcoming 2025 parliamentary elections, followed in second place on the state list by Anna-Elisabeth von Treuenfels-Frowein, the former Hamburg frontwoman of the FDP, who switched to the Hamburg CDU in July 2024. On 7 September 2024, Thering was placed first on the state list for the 2025 Hamburg elections by the CDU state representatives' meeting with just under 92 percent of the vote.

== Memberships and cultural involvement ==
Thering is a member of the following clubs and associations:

- Heimatverein Hamburg-Hummelsbüttel (Hamburg-Hummelsbüttel Homeland Society)
- Bürgerverein Sasel-Poppenbüttel von 1955 (Sasel-Poppenbüttel Citizens' Association of 1955)
- Förderverein der Freiwilligen Feuerwehr Hummelsbüttel (Hummelsbüttel Volunteer Fire Brigade Support Association)
- Duvenstedter Sportverein von 1969 (Duvenstedter Sports Club of 1969)
- Bürgerverein Duvenstedt/Wohldorf-Ohlstedt (Citizens' Association Duvenstedt/Wohldorf-Ohlstedt)
- Verein Heimatbund Hamburg-Lemsahl-Mellingstedt (Homeland Association Hamburg-Lemsahl-Mellingstedt)
- Vereinigung Duvenstedt (seit 1961) (Duvenstedt Association (since 1961))
- Freundeskreis des Hospital zum Heiligen Geist (Friends of the Holy Spirit Hospital)
- Freundeskreis von „Hände für Kinder“ (Circle of Friends of "Hands for Children")
- Stiftungsrat der Curator-Stiftung für das Hospital zum Heiligen Geist in Poppenbüttel (Board of Trustees of the Curator Foundation for the Hospital zum Heiligen Geist in Poppenbüttel)
