= Anke Frieling =

German politician

Member of the Hamburg Parliament
- Incumbent
- Assumed office 2020

Personal details
- Born: North Rhine-Westphalia, West Germany
- Party: Christian Democratic Union of Germany
- Other political affiliations: CDU Hamburg
- Education: LMU Munich; Free University of Berlin (PhD)

Anke Frieling (born 30 May 1962) is a German politician of the Christian Democratic Union (CDU) and deputy chairman of the CDU parliamentary group in the Hamburg Parliament.

== Education and professional career ==
Born in North Rhine-Westphalia, Frieling studied business administration at LMU Munich and subsequently earned her doctorate degree from the Free University of Berlin. From 1999 to 2004, Frieling worked at a bank in Frankfurt. She has been living in Hamburg since 2004. As of 2022, she is working as a project manager in the healthcare industry.

== Political commitment ==
Frieling has been an active member of the CDU Hamburg since moving there in 2004. First she was a member of the Altona District Assembly and, since the last election in 2020, a member of the Hamburg Parliament.

On 23 February 2020, Frieling was elected to the Hamburg Parliament. She, under chairman Dennis Thering, is one of two deputy chairmen of the CDU parliamentary group. Frieling works as the parliamentary group's spokesperson for urban development and science. Additionally, she is one of four vice chairmen of the CDU Hamburg.

== Publications ==
"Self-restraint measures by companies. Their importance for handling conflicts with social interest groups" (German: Selbstbeschränkungsmaßnahmen von Unternehmungen. Ihre Bedeutung für die Handhabung von Konflikten mit gesellschaftlichen Interessengruppen, PhD thesis, Frankfurt am Main 1992, ISBN 3-631-44646-2.
