= Clarissa Herbst =

German politician (born 1981)

Member of the Hamburg Parliament
- Incumbent
- Assumed office 1 June 2020
- Preceded by: Dorothee Martin
- Constituency: Fuhlsbüttel – Alsterdorf – Langenhorn

Personal details
- Born: 6 January 1981 (age 45)
- Party: Social Democratic Party (since 2016)

Clarissa Herbst (born 6 January 1981) is a German politician serving as a member of the Hamburg Parliament since 2020. She is the chairwoman of the Social Democratic Party in Northern Langenhorn.
