= Katharina Beck =

German politician (born 1982)

Member of the Bundestag
- Incumbent
- Assumed office 2021

Personal details
- Born: 13 April 1982 (age 44) Düsseldorf
- Party: Alliance 90/The Greens

Katharina Beck (born 1982) is a German politician (Alliance 90/The Greens). She was elected member of the German Bundestag in the 2021 German federal election. She was a list candidate for the Green Party in Hamburg and nominally represents the Hamburg-Nord electoral district.

== Early life and education ==
Beck was born to a family of bakers in Düsseldorf in 1982 and grew up in Duisburg. While her parents both attended university, she described her family as very down-to-earth. She studied Latin American studies at the University of Cologne and the National University of Tucumán.

== Early career ==
After graduating, Beck was President of oikos International from 2007 to 2009 and worked at the Institute for Social Banking from 2009 to 2011.

Beck worked as a management consultant, specialising in sustainability, at Accenture before her election as MP.

== Political career ==
Beck joined the Greens at the age of 27 in 2009. Katharina Fegebank, later second mayor of Hamburg, became her mentor in 2012. She became chair of the Green's federal working party on economic and financial affairs and speaker of working party chairs.

Beck has been politically active in Hamburg in the district association Hamburg-Nord since 2011. She was the spokeswoman for all 25 federal working groups of Bündnis 90/Die Grünen as well as the spokeswoman for the federal working group for economic afffairs and finance. From 2017 to 2021 she was a member of the Economic Advisory Council of the Green Party's parliamentary group in the Bundestag.

In 2021 Beck ran as a direct candidate for the district of Hamburg-Nord and as a top candidate for list number 1 of the Hamburg Greens and entered the Bundestag via the state list.

== Other activities ==
- Nuclear Waste Disposal Fund (KENFO), Member of the Board of Trustees (since 2025)
- KfW, Member of the Board of Supervisory Directors (since 2022)

== Political positions ==
One of Beck's main political goals is for the success of companies to be measured not only by profit, but social and environmental indicators. She said that she aims to increase the Green Party's economic expertise and standing.

She counts Jacinda Ardern, Kamala Harris and Alexandria Ocasio-Cortez among her political role models.
