= Hans Apel =

German politician (1932–2011)

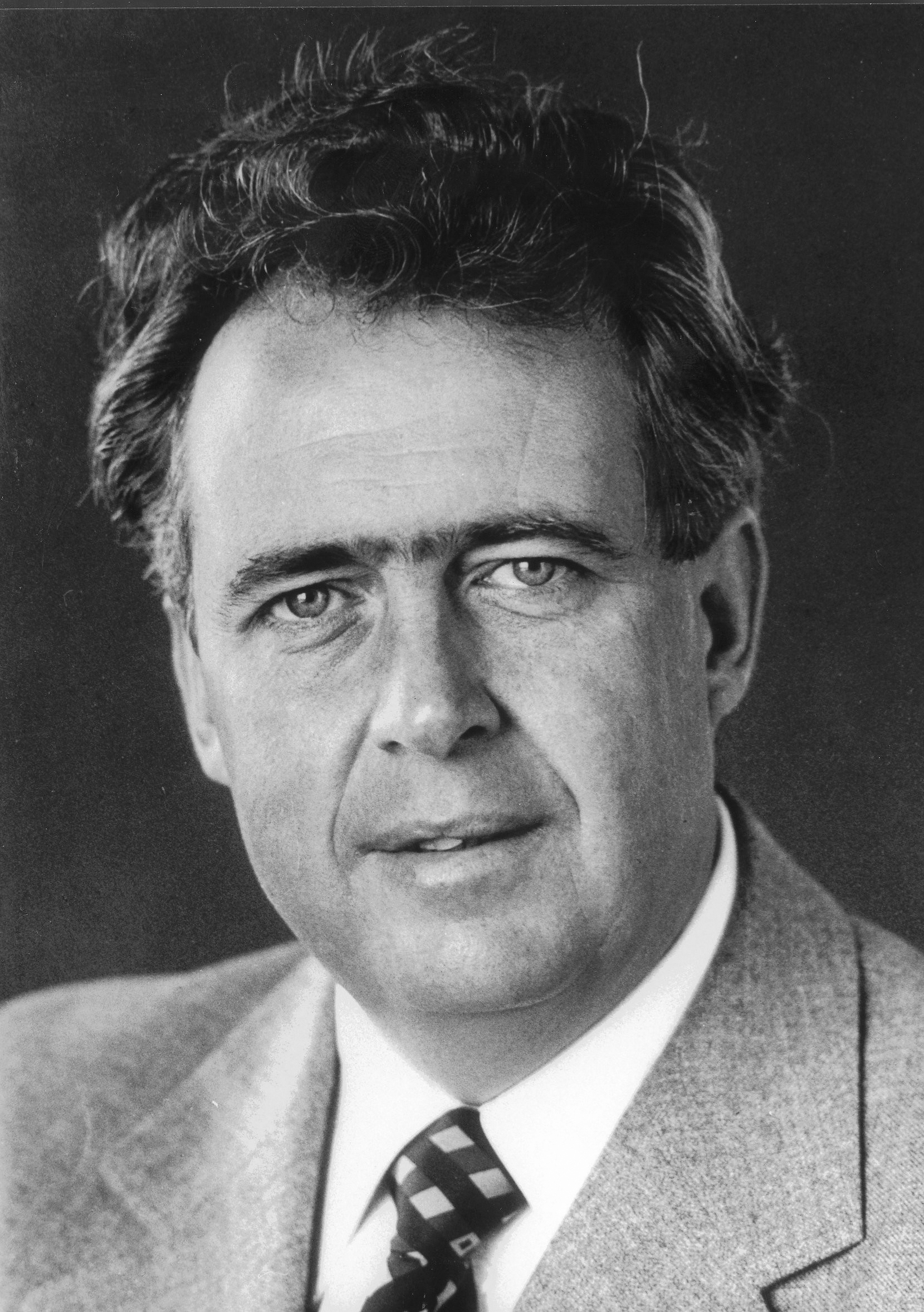
- Apel in 1978

Minister of Defence
- In office 16 February 1978 – 1 October 1982
- Chancellor: Helmut Schmidt
- Preceded by: Georg Leber
- Succeeded by: Manfred Wörner

Minister of Finance
- In office 16 May 1974 – 16 February 1978
- Chancellor: Helmut Schmidt
- Preceded by: Helmut Schmidt
- Succeeded by: Hans Matthöfer

Parliamentary State Secretary in the Foreign Office
- In office 15 December 1972 – 16 May 1974
- Minister: Walter Scheel
- Preceded by: Karl Moersch
- Succeeded by: Hans-Jürgen Wischnewski

Deputy Chairman of the SPD Parliamentary Group in the Bundestag
- In office 6 March 1983 – 5 September 1988
- In office 28 September 1969 – 19 November 1972

Member of the Bundestag; from Hamburg
- In office 19 October 1965 – 20 December 1990
- Preceded by: Max Brauer
- Succeeded by: Multi-member district
- Constituency: Hamburg-Nord I (1965–1980); Hamburg-Nord (1980–1987); State list (1987–1990)

Personal details
- Born: Hans Eberhard Apel; 25 February 1932 Hamburg, Germany
- Died: 6 September 2011 (aged 79) Hamburg, Germany
- Party: Social Democratic (after 1955)
- Children: 2
- Education: University of Hamburg
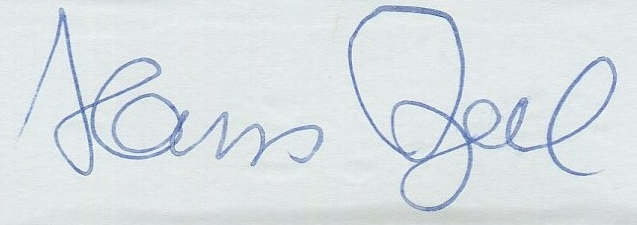
- Signature

Hans Eberhard Apel (25 February 1932 – 6 September 2011) was a German politician and a member of the Social Democratic Party (SPD). From 1972 to 1974 he was Parliamentary State Secretary to the Foreign Minister. From 1974 to 1978 he was the Minister of Finance and from 1978 to 1982 he was the Minister of Defence.

== Education and career ==
After completing his Abitur (roughly equivalent to graduating high school, A-Level exam) in 1954 in Hamburg, Apel served an apprenticeship as an import and export businessman, in Hamburg. After completing his apprenticeship, Apel went to university, where he studied economics. In 1960, he was awarded a doctorate in Political Science. From 1958 to 1961, he was the Secretary of the Socialist Group in the European Parliament.

In 1962, Apel became a civil servant at the European Parliament, where he served as Department Head responsible for Economics, Finance and Transport. In 1993, he was appointed an honorary professor of economics at the University of Rostock.

== Politics ==
Apel joined the SPD in 1955. From 1970 to 1988, he was a member of the National Executive (Bundesvorstand) of the SPD, and from 1986 to 1988 he was also a member of the executive board (Präsidium). From 1965 to 1990, Apel was a member of the German Bundestag, representing Hamburg-Nord. In 1969, he was deputy chairman of the SPD parliamentary group and again in 1983, after the new elections, until 1988.

== Government positions ==
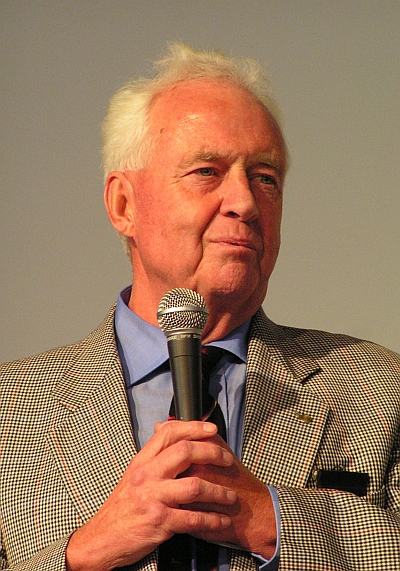
Apel in 2005

In 1972, Apel was appointed Parliamentary State Secretary for European Questions at the German Foreign Office. In 1974, he was appointed Finance Minister in the government of Helmut Schmidt. After the cabinet reshuffle of 1978, he was put in charge of the Ministry of Defense.

He left government on 1 October 1982, after Helmut Kohl became Chancellor. In 1985, Apel ran as the top candidate for the SPD in Berlin, which implied standing as Mayor of Berlin, but lost to the CDU candidate Eberhard Diepgen.

== Religion ==
Apel spent his later years speaking about religion. In 2004, he was awarded the Walter Künneth Prize by the "Kirchliche Sammlung um Bibel und Bekenntnis in Bayern" (the Ecclesiastical Assembly for the Bible and Commitment in Bavaria), a conservative Lutheran organization. The prize, named after the German theologian, Walter Künneth, was awarded principally for Apel's book Volkskirche ohne Volk (People's Church without a People), in which he criticizes the "rampant modernism" of the Evangelical Church; he left the North Elbian Evangelical Church and joined the Independent Evangelical-Lutheran Church.

== Personal life ==
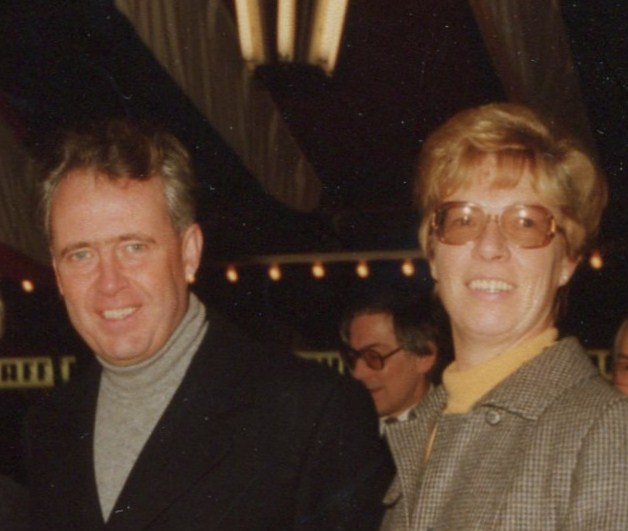
Mr. and Mrs. Apel in 1990

Hans and Ingrid Apel married in 1956; they had two daughters.

== See also ==
- List of German finance ministers

Political offices
Preceded by Georg Leber	Federal Minister of Defence (Germany); 1978–82	Succeeded by Manfred Wörner
