= FDP Hamburg =

Regional state association of the FDP in Hamburg, Germany

- Chairperson: Sonja Jacobsen
- Founded: 20 September 1945; 81 years ago
- Headquarters: Hopfenmarkt 31; 20457 Hamburg
- Membership: 1,948
- Ideology: Liberalism; Classical liberalism Pro-Europeanism
- Political position: Centre to Centre-right
- National affiliation: Free Democratic Party
- Colours: Yellow; Pink; Cyan
- Hamburg Parliament: 0 / 123
- Bundestag delegation: 0 / 16

Website
- www.fdphamburg.de

The FDP Hamburg is the regional state association of the Free Democratic Party (FDP) in Hamburg. It was founded on September 20, 1945, as the first liberal state party in West Germany.

The party's parliamentary group was a member of the Hamburg Parliament from 1946 to 1978, from 1987 to 1993, from 2001 to 2004 and from 2011 to 2020. Since the 2020 state elections in Hamburg, the FDP Hamburg has been represented by one directly elected, non-attached member of parliament only and does not have its own parliamentary group. As of 2019, the party has about 1,544 members.

In 2023, Sonja Jacobsen had been elected as chairwoman of the party.

== Election results ==
Since the FDP received a result of only 4.97% in the 2020 state elections and therefore failed to pass the five percent hurdle, the party was not represented by a parliamentary group in the Hamburg Parliament. However, thanks to a constituency mandate, top candidate Anna von Treuenfels was appointed as member of the Hamburg Parliament.

In January 2022, former member of the SPD Sami Musa joined the FDP Hamburg. Therefore, the FDP was represented by two members in the Hamburg Parliament. Anna-Elisabeth von Treuenfels-Frowein left the party in July 2024 for the CDU, therefore only one member represents the FDP in the Hamburg Parliament.
