= Rothenburgsort =

- Quarter of Hamburg
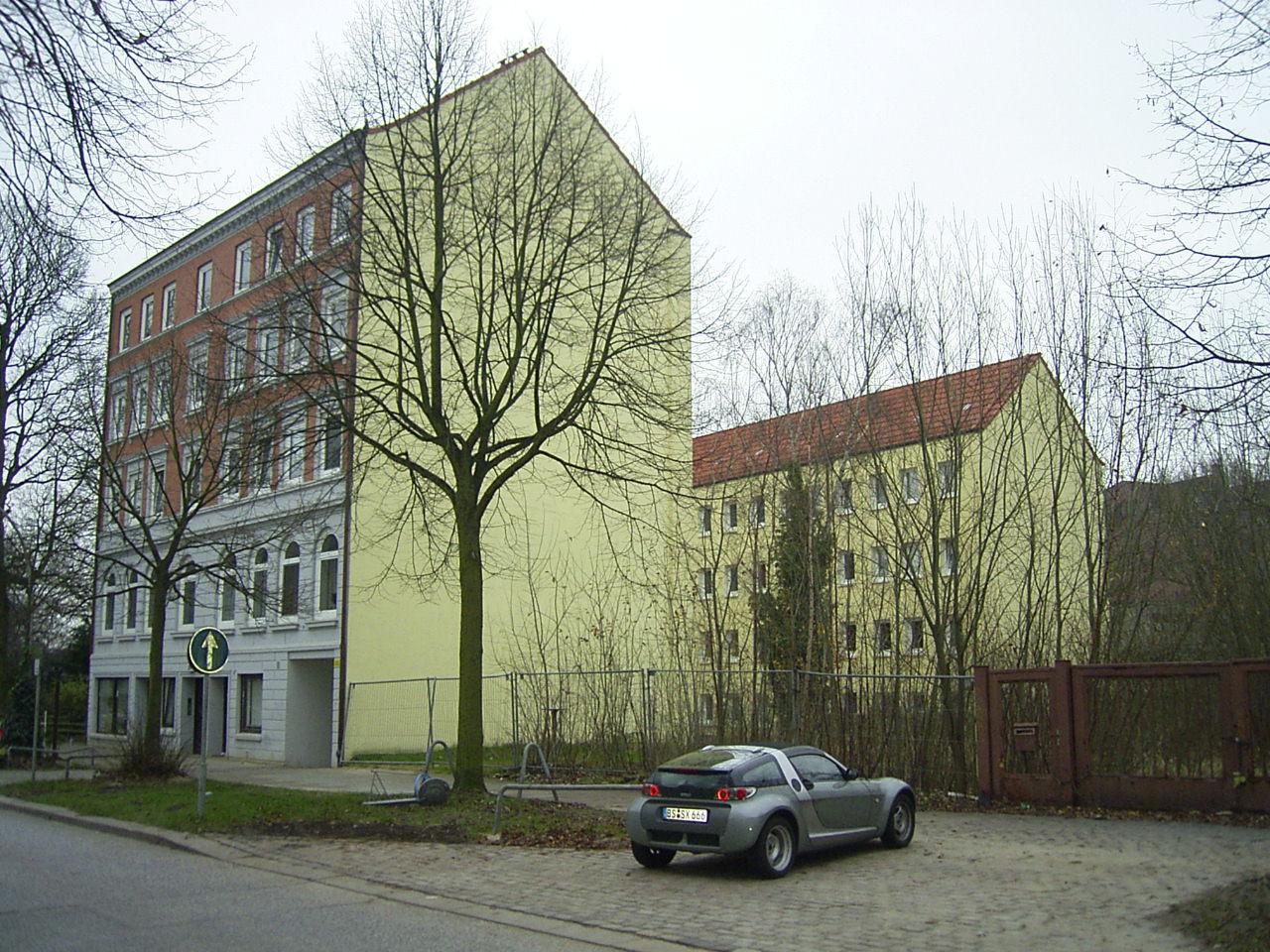
- Flat buildings at Vierländer Damm street.

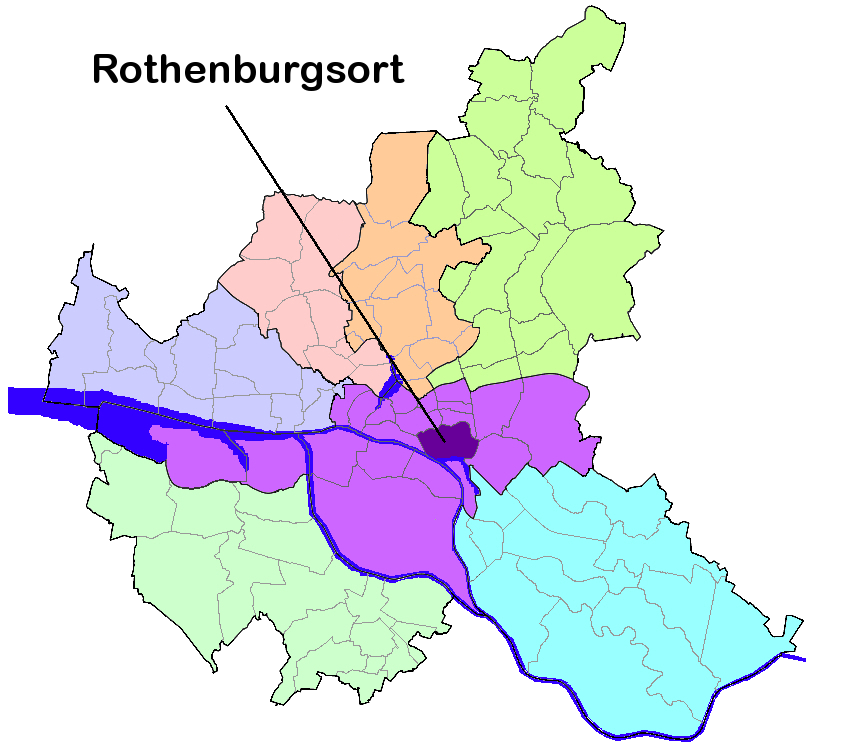
- Location of Rothenburgsort in Hamburg
- Interactive map of Rothenburgsort
- Location within Germany Location within Hamburg
- Coordinates: 53°32′6″N 10°2′26″E
- Country: Germany
- State: Hamburg
- City: Hamburg
- Borough: Hamburg-Mitte

Area
  - Total: 7.4 km^{2} (2.9 sq mi)

Population (2024-12-31)
  - Total: 11,236
  - Density: 1,500/km^{2} (3,900/sq mi)
- Time zone: UTC+01:00 (CET)
  - Summer (DST): UTC+02:00 (CEST)
- Dialling codes: 040
- Vehicle registration: HH

Rothenburgsort (German pronunciation: [ˈʁoːtn̩bʊʁksˌʔɔʁt]) is a quarter (German: Stadtteil) in the Hamburg-Mitte borough of the Free and Hanseatic City of Hamburg in northern Germany. In December 2023, the population was 10,317.

== History ==
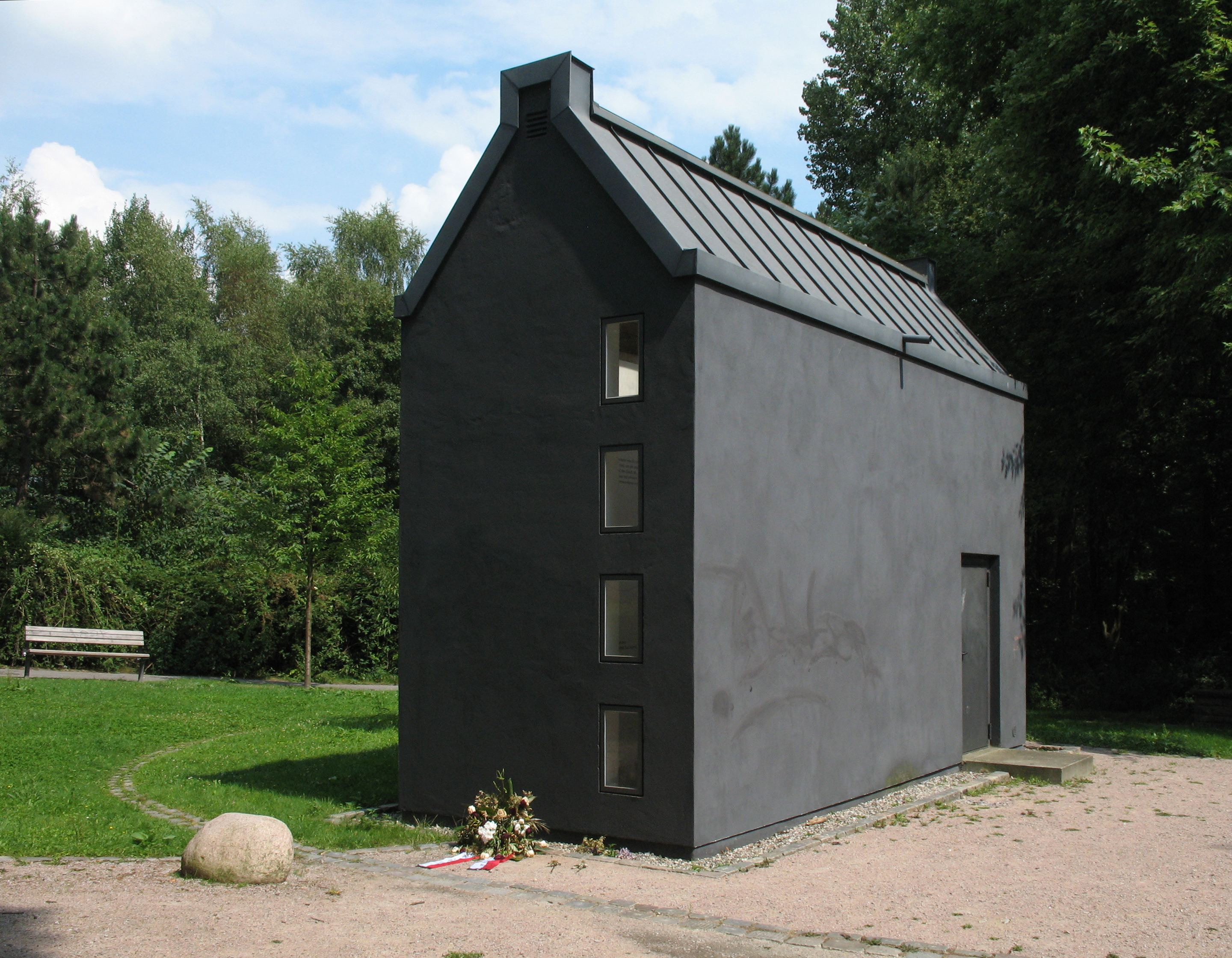
Memorial to victims of the Bombing of Hamburg in World War II

== Geography ==
The quarter is situated in the south-east center of Hamburg. It borders with the Hamburg quarters of Billbrook, Hammerbrook, Hamm, HafenCity, Veddel, and Wilhelmsburg in the Hamburg-Mitte borough; Moorfleet, Spadenland, and Tatenberg in the Bergedorf borough.

== Demographics ==
In 2006 the population of the Rothenburgsort quarter was 8660 with 15.8% being children under the age of 18, and 16.7% being 65 years of age or older. Resident aliens were 27.5% of the population. 552 people were registered as unemployed. The population density was 1,165/km^{2} (3,017/sq mi).

In 1999 there were 4,324 households, out of which 20.6% had children under the age of 18 living with them and 48.3% of all households were made up of individuals. The average household size was 2.05.

== Notable residents ==
- Morsal Obeidi – murder victim

== Notes ==
=== References ===
- Selectable database: Statistical office Hamburg and Schleswig-Holstein Statistisches Amt für Hamburg und Schleswig-Holstein. (in German)
