= Spadenland =

- Quarter of Hamburg
- Interactive map of Spadenland
- Location within Germany Location within Hamburg
- Coordinates: 53°29′16″N 10°3′28″E
- Country: Germany
- State: Hamburg
- City: Hamburg
- Borough: Bergedorf

Area
  - Total: 3.4 km^{2} (1.3 sq mi)

Population (2024-12-31)
  - Total: 537
  - Density: 160/km^{2} (410/sq mi)
- Time zone: UTC+01:00 (CET)
  - Summer (DST): UTC+02:00 (CEST)
- Dialling codes: 040
- Vehicle registration: HH

Spadenland (German pronunciation: [ˈʃpaːdn̩lant]) is a quarter in Hamburg, Germany, in the borough of Bergedorf at the Elbe. In 2020 the population was 539 people. Agriculture plays a very big role in this quarter for the metropolitan area.

== Geography ==
Spadenland is located at the Elbe river. It borders to the quarters Tatenberg, Ochsenwerder, Wilhelmsburg and Rothenburgsort.

== Politics ==
These are the results of Ochsenwerder in the Hamburg state election in 2015:

- SPD 48.5% (+9.2)
- CDU 27.7% (-12.4)
- The Greens 4.1% (-1.3)
- AfD 6.3% (+6.3)
- FDP 7.9% (-0.7)
- The Left 3.6% (-0.5)
- Others 1.9% (-0.8)

Spandenland and Tatenberg were the only quarters where the CDU won the majority of the votes in the Hamburg state election in 2011. However the CDU also lost these two quarters in the Hamburg state election in 2015 and the SPD became the most popular party in these quarters as well.

== Transport ==
Spadenland has no S-Bahn or U-Bahn station but two different bus lines.
