= Deniz Çelik (politician) =

German politician (born 1978)

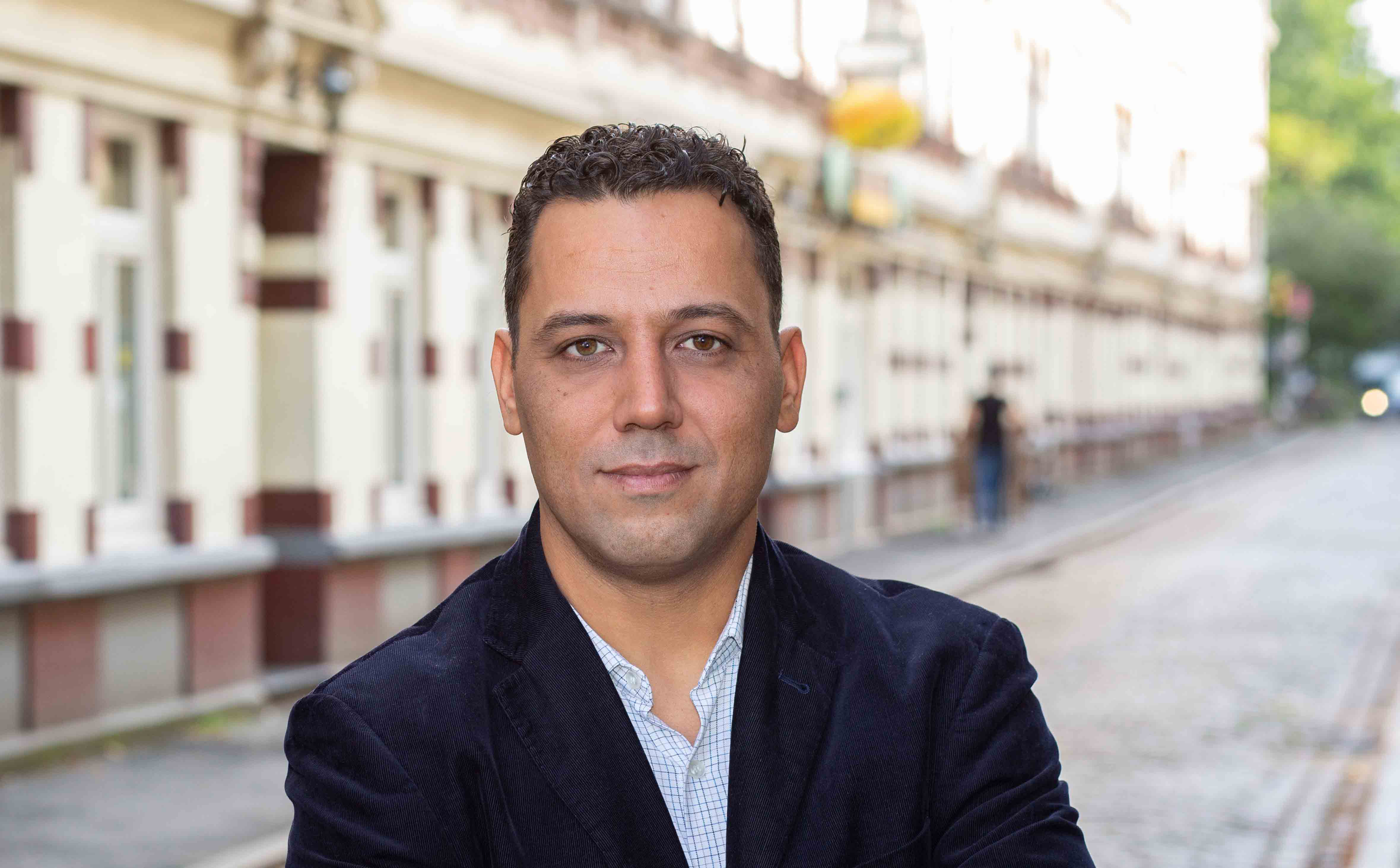
- Çelik in 2021

Member of the Hamburg Parliament
- Incumbent
- Assumed office 14 April 2015
- Constituency: Barmbek–Uhlenhorst–Dulsberg

Personal details
- Born: 3 November 1978 (age 47)
- Party: Die Linke (since 2008)

Deniz Çelik (born 3 November 1978) is a German politician serving as a member of the Hamburg Parliament since 2015. He has served as vice president of the Parliament since 2020.
