= Anna-Elisabeth von Treuenfels-Frowein =

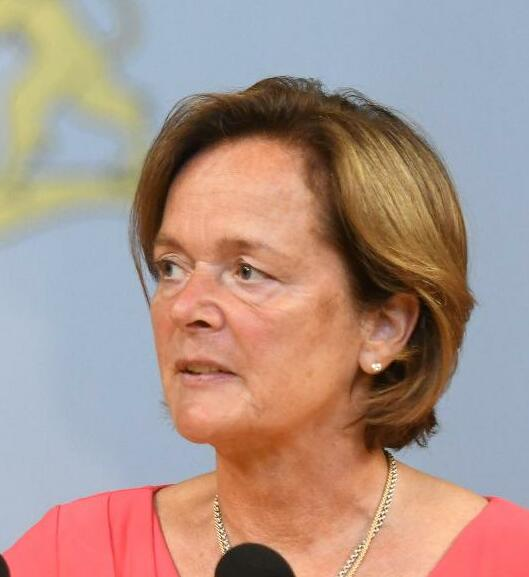
- von Treuenfels-Frowein in 2020

Member of the Hamburg Parliament
- Incumbent
- Assumed office 20 February 2011
- Constituency: Blankenese

Personal details
- Born: Anna-Elisabeth von der Decken; 13 May 1962 (age 64) Freiburg im Breisgau, West Germany
- Party: CDU (since 2024)
- Other political affiliations: FDP (2009–2024)
- Spouse: Robert Frowein
- Children: 3
- Education: University of Hamburg

Anna-Elisabeth von Treuenfels-Frowein (née von der Decken; born 13 May 1962) is a German politician from the Christian Democratic Union of Germany (CDU). She represents Blankenese in the Hamburg Parliament.

== Personal life and education ==
Von Treuenfels-Frowein graduated from Hochrad high school in Hamburg-Othmarschen in 1983, studied law at the University of Hamburg from 1984 and passed her first state examination in 1991. She completed her legal clerkship in Hamburg in 1995 and successfully passed her second state examination that same year. She then worked for two law firms and spent time in Brazil between 1997 and 1999.

Von Treuenfels-Frowein has three children and lives in the Hamburg district of Uhlenhorst. She is married to the Hamburg entrepreneur Robert Frowein, who ran for the FDP in the 2019 Hamburg district assembly elections in the Bahrenfeld-West/Groß Flottbek/Othmarschen constituency and was ranked 45th on the FDP state list for the 2015 parliamentary elections.

== Political career ==
In 2008, Anna-Elisabeth von Treuenfels-Frowein supported the campaign of the citizens' initiative “We want to learn” for the referendum against the introduction of primary schools, which campaigned against the abolition of grammar schools in their current form and against the introduction of primary schools. The initiative was supported solely by the FDP, which led to the first contact with the Free Democrats. In March 2009, she joined the Hamburg FDP and was primarily involved in education policy. She was the FDP campaign manager for the referendum and the referendum on 18 July 2010 against the school reform in Hamburg negotiated by the then black-green government under Ole von Beust and Christa Goetsch.

=== Hamburg Parliament ===
In the subsequent parliamentary elections in February 2011, she stood as a candidate in her constituency of Blankenese and was elected to the Hamburg Parliament in the fourth position on the FDP list. She became deputy chairwoman of the FDP parliamentary group in February 2011 and was a member of the School Committee, the Committee for Justice, Data Protection and Equality and a deputy member of the Family, Children and Youth Committee and the Science Committee in the 20th parliamentary term.

In the 2015 parliamentary elections in Hamburg, she was re-elected to parliament with 2.8 per cent via her state list position 4. In the 21st parliamentary term, she continued to be a full member of the Committee for Justice, Data Protection and Equality, the School Committee and a deputy member of the Family, Children and Youth Committee and the Science Committee.

After the previous parliamentary group chair Katja Suding was elected to the German Bundestag in the 2017 federal elections, von Treuenfels-Frowein was elected chair of the parliamentary group together with the previous Parliamentary Secretary Michael Kruse.

At the end of September 2019, she was elected as her party's top candidate for the 2020 parliamentary elections. She prevailed with 62.4 per cent against Sat.1 editor Sonja Jacobsen. She won a constituency mandate in her constituency of Blankenese and, after the FDP failed to reach the five per cent hurdle, was the only representative of her party to re-enter Hamburg parliament. In April 2021, she ran for the second place on the FDP Hamburg list for the 2021 federal election, but was defeated by the former federal chairwoman of the Young Liberals Ria Schröder.

On 11 July 2024, von Treuenfels-Frowein left the FDP and joined the CDU. On 7 September 2024, she was placed second on the Hamburg CDU's state list for the 2025 parliamentary elections.
