= Sandro Kappe =

German politician (born 1985)

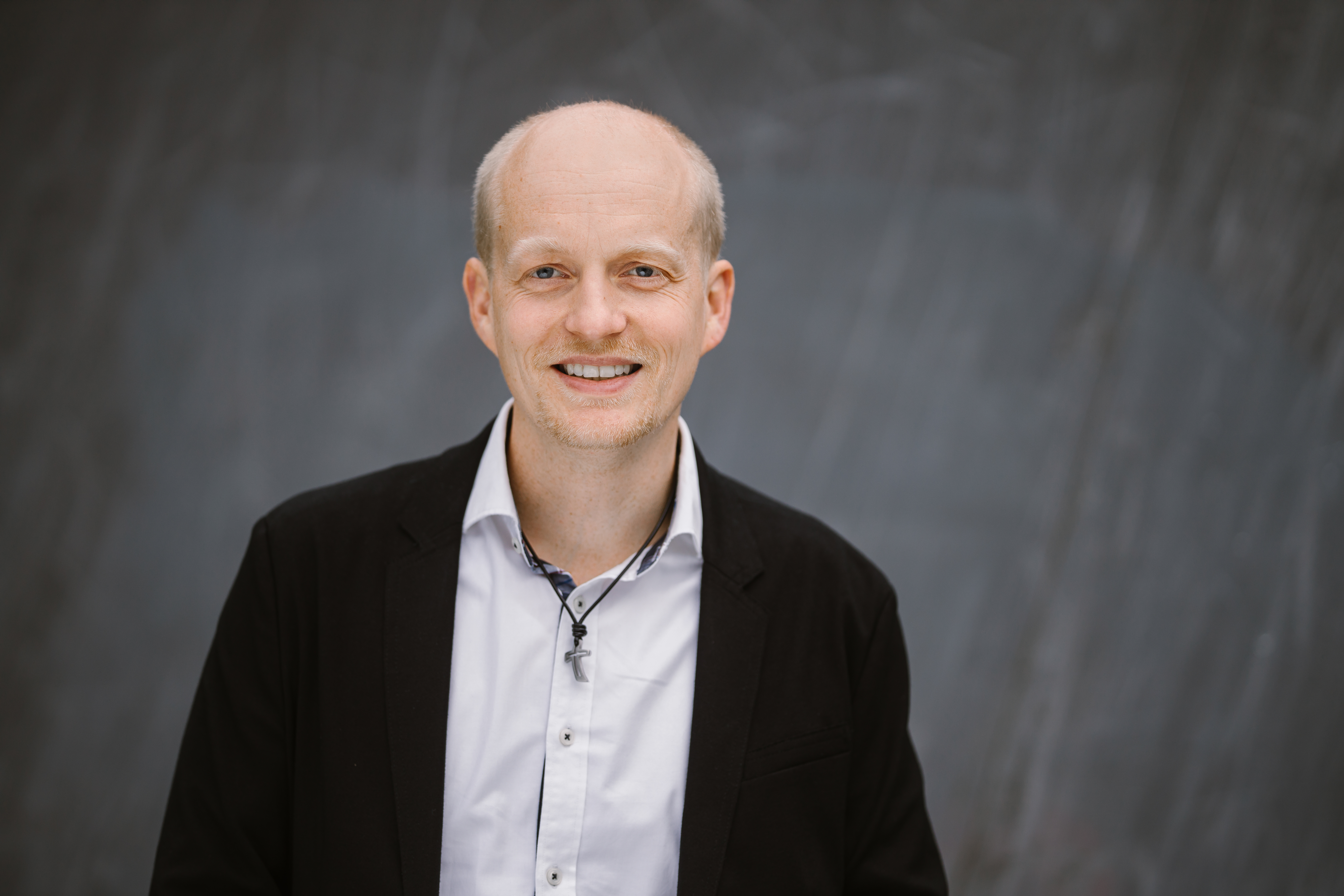
- Kappe in 2020

Member of the Hamburg Parliament
- Incumbent
- Assumed office 18 March 2020
- Constituency: Bramfeld–Farmsen-Berne–Steilshoop

Personal details
- Born: 30 September 1985 (age 41) Teterow
- Party: Christian Democratic Union (since 2005)

Sandro Kappe (born 30 September 1985 in Teterow) is a German politician serving as a member of the Hamburg Parliament since 2020. From 2014 to 2020, he was a borough councillor of Wandsbek.
