= Dennis Gladiator =

German politician (born 1981)

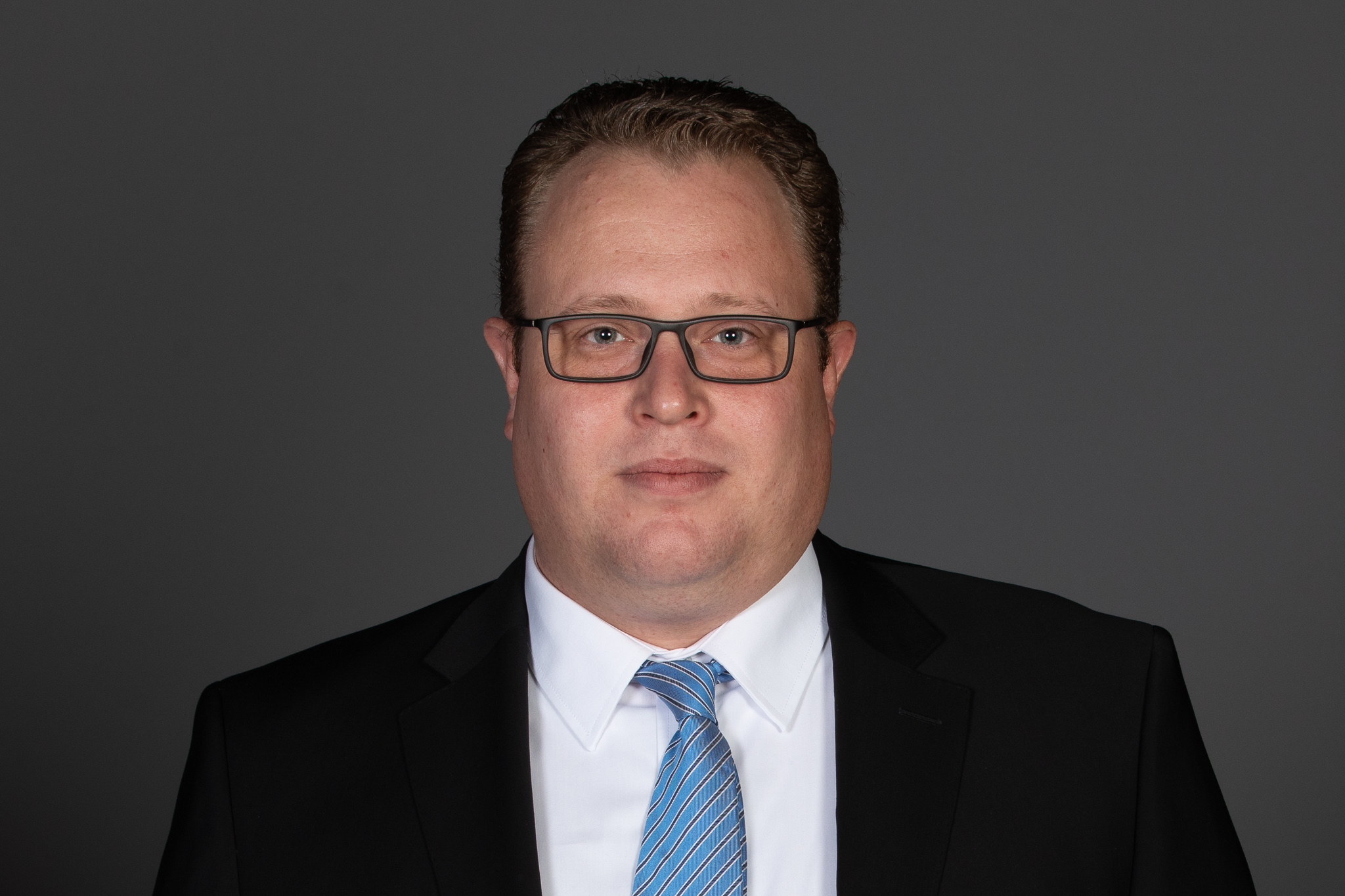
- Gladiator in 2018

Member of the Hamburg Parliament
- Incumbent
- Assumed office 7 March 2011

Personal details
- Born: 10 June 1981 (age 44) Hamburg
- Party: Christian Democratic Union (since 2000)

Dennis Gladiator (born 10 June 1981 in Hamburg) is a German politician serving as a member of the Hamburg Parliament since 2011. He is the chief whip of the Christian Democratic Union.
