= Christoph Ploß =

German politician (born 1985)

Christoph Ploß MdB
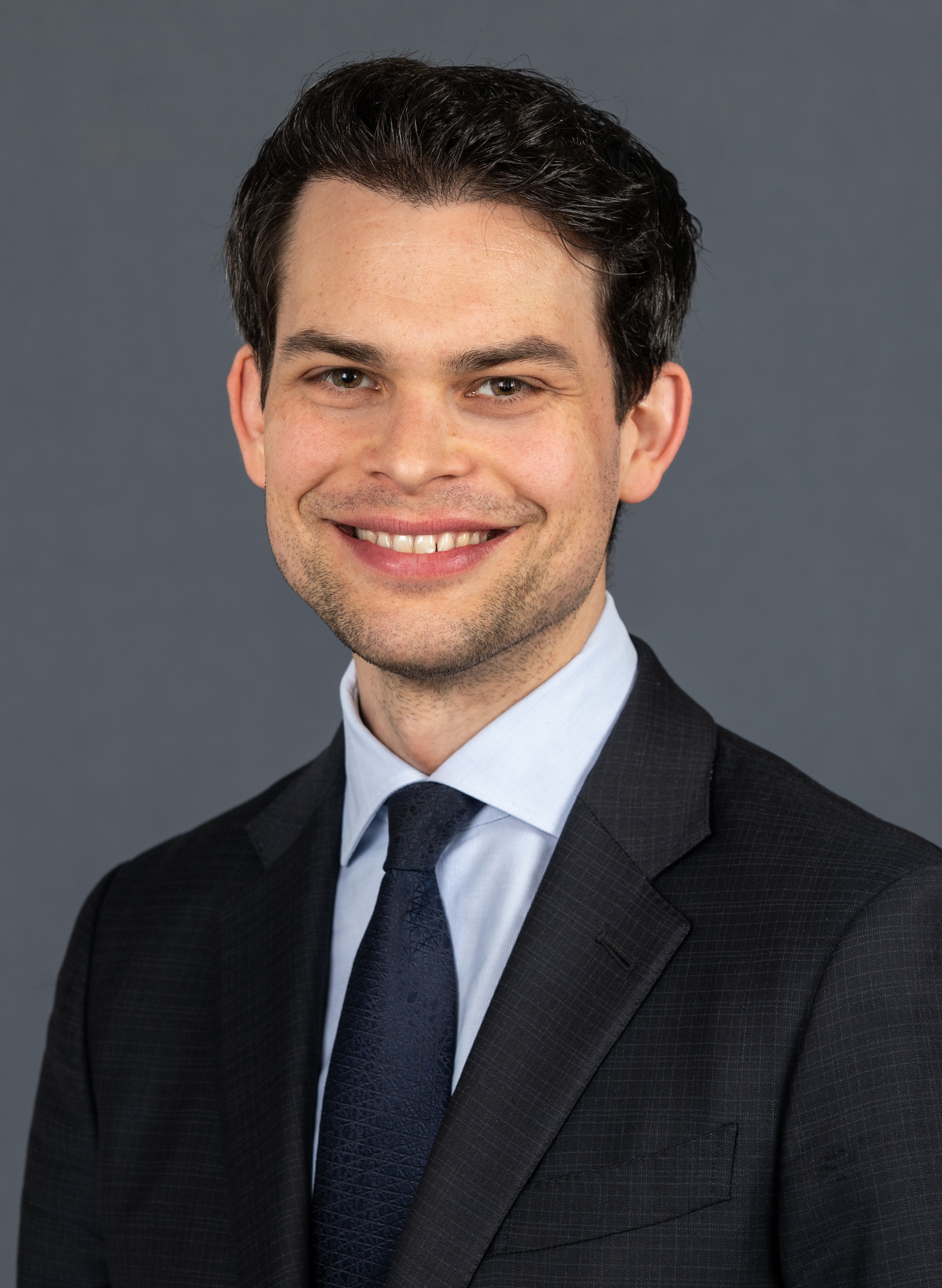
- Ploß in 2020

Chairman of the Christian Democratic Union of Hamburg
- In office 26 September 2020 – 3 April 2023
- Preceded by: Roland Heintze
- Succeeded by: Dennis Thering

Member of the Bundestag; from Hamburg
- Incumbent
- Assumed office 24 October 2017
- Preceded by: Dirk Fischer
- Constituency: Hamburg-Nord (2017–2021); State list (2021–2025); Hamburg-Nord (2025–present)

Personal details
- Born: Christoph Johannes Ploß; 19 July 1985 (age 41) Hamburg, West Germany
- Party: Christian Democratic Union
- Education: Johanneum Gymnasium; University of Hamburg

Christoph Ploß (born 19 July 1985) is a German politician of the Christian Democratic Union (CDU) who has been serving as a member of the Bundestag from the state of Hamburg since 2017.

In addition to his parliamentary mandate, Ploß has been serving as Coordinator for the Maritime Industry and Tourism at the Federal Ministry for Economic Affairs and Energy since 2025.

== Early life ==
Ploß completed his abitur at the Johanneum Gymnasium in 2005. From 2015 until 2017, he worked in media relations at Bauer Media Group.

== Political career ==
Ploß became a member of the Bundestag after the 2017 German federal election. He is a member of the Committee on European Affairs and the Committee on Transport and Digital Infrastructure.

In addition to his committee assignments, Ploß has been chairing the German Parliamentary Friendship Group for Relations with Arabic-Speaking States in the Middle East since 2022.

In 2020, Roland Heintze proposed Ploß as candidate to succeed him as chairman of the CDU in Hamburg; at a party convention, Ploß was subsequently elected by a majority of 86 percent. Ahead of the 2021 elections, Ploß was elected to lead the CDU campaign in Hamburg.

Ploß stepped down as chairman in April 2023 and passed the chairmanship to Dennis Thering, who was elected by the party members with 185 out of 197 votes; 8 delegates voted against him, 4 abstained. Ploß remains chairman of the regional group of the CDU in the Bundestag and chairman of the CDU Hamburg's regional association CDU Hamburg-Nord.

== Political positions ==
In 2020, Ploß opposed plans to introduce a mandatory women quota within the CDU's regional and national governing bodies by 2025.

Ahead of the Christian Democrats' leadership election, Ploß publicly endorsed in 2020 Friedrich Merz to succeed Annegret Kramp-Karrenbauer as the party's chair.
