= Benjamin Mennerich =

German politician (born 1981)

Member of the Hamburg Parliament
- Incumbent
- Assumed office 26 March 2025

Personal details
- Born: 1981 (age 44–45)
- Party: Alternative for Germany (since 2015)

Benjamin Mennerich (born 1981) is a German politician serving as a member of the Hamburg Parliament since 2025. He has been a member of the Alternative for Germany since 2015.
