= Billbrook =

Quarter of Hamburg, Germany

- Quarter of Hamburg
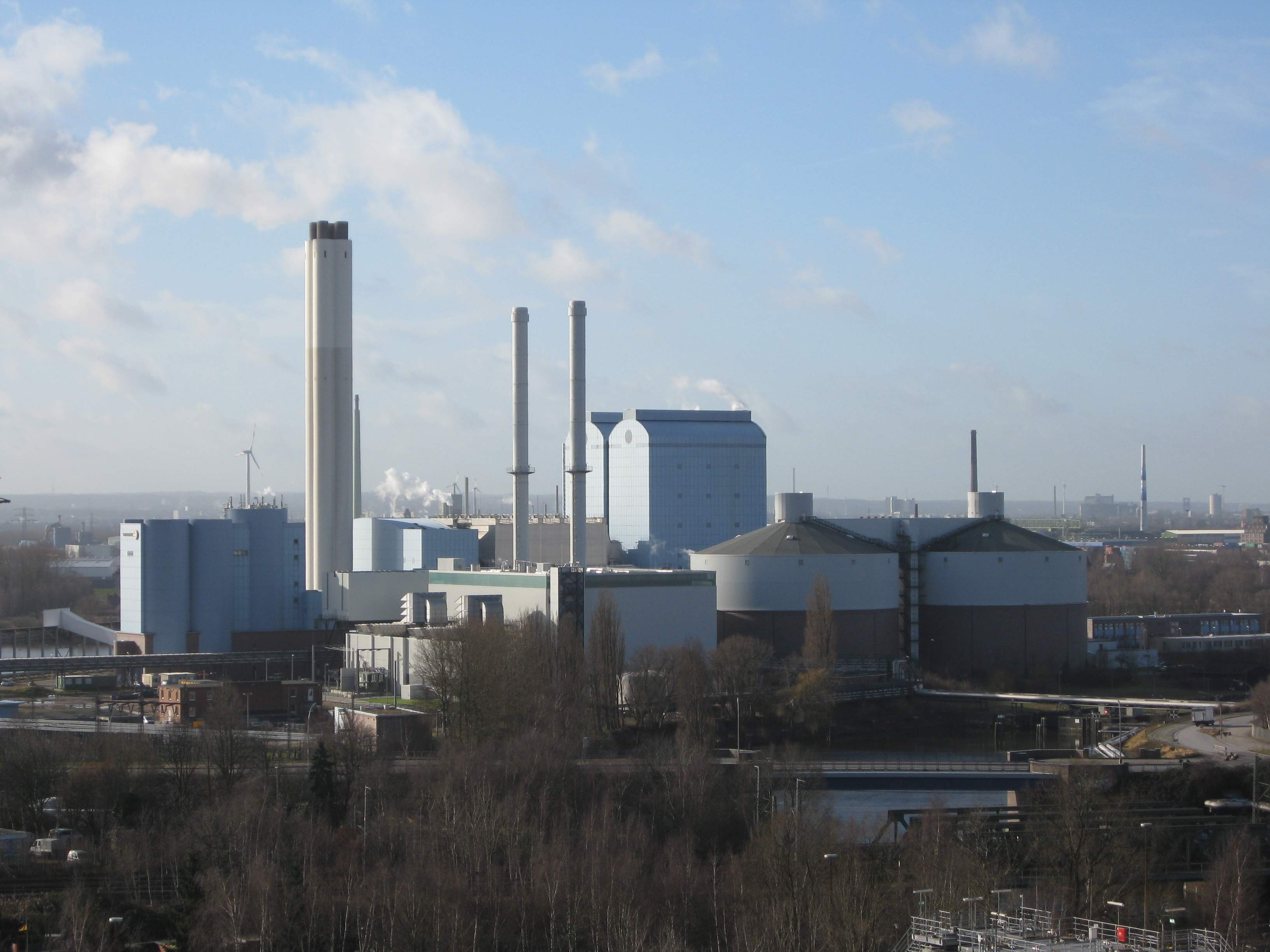
- Tiefstack Power Plant
- Interactive map of Billbrook
- Location within Germany Location within Hamburg
- Coordinates: 53°31′20″N 10°05′18″E
- Country: Germany
- State: Hamburg
- City: Hamburg
- Borough: Hamburg-Mitte

Area
  - Total: 6.1 km^{2} (2.4 sq mi)

Population (2024-12-31)
  - Total: 1,851
  - Density: 300/km^{2} (790/sq mi)
- Time zone: UTC+01:00 (CET)
  - Summer (DST): UTC+02:00 (CEST)
- Dialling codes: 040
- Vehicle registration: HH

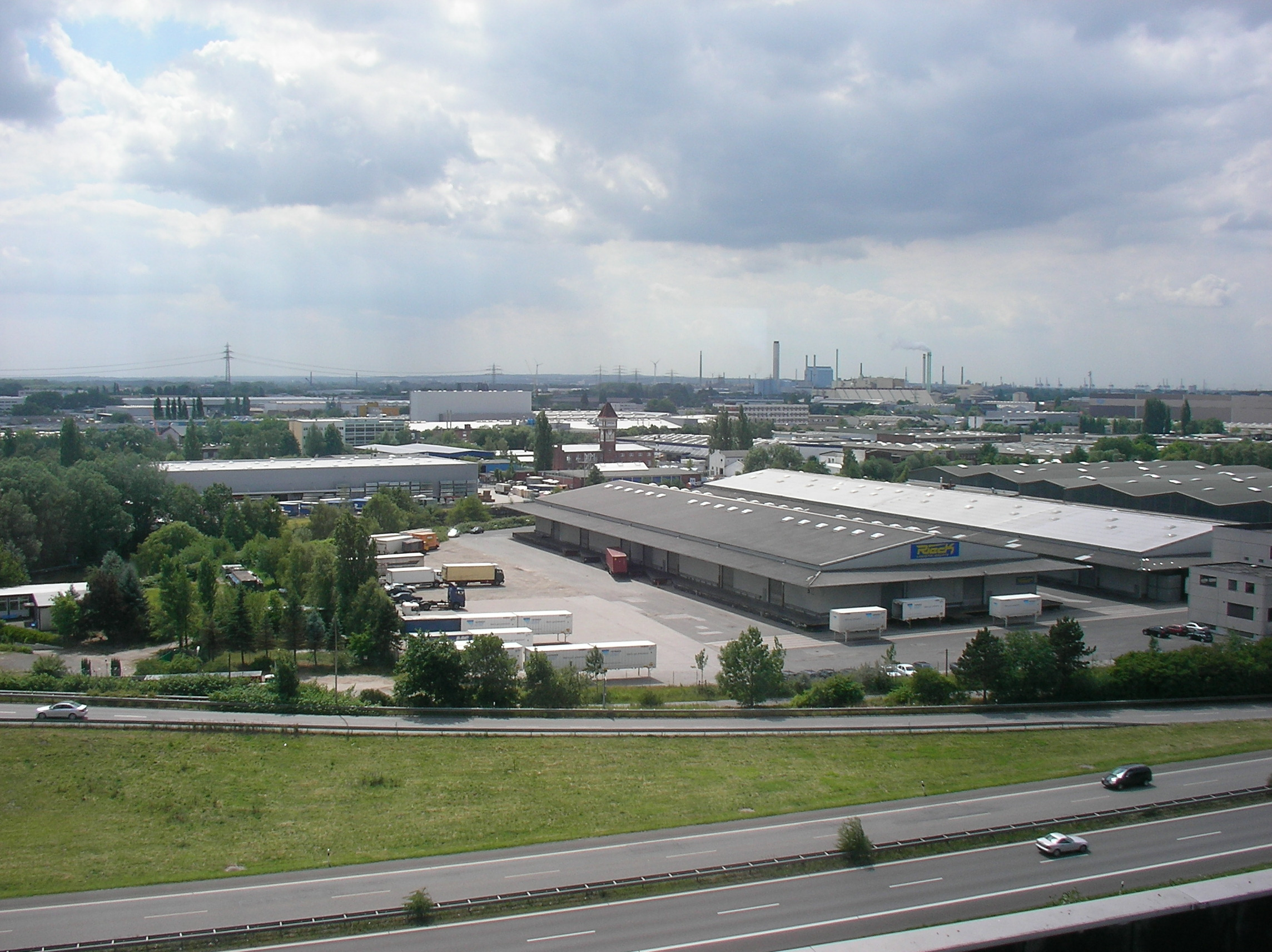
View over Billbrook from the B5 road

Billbrook (German pronunciation: [ˈbɪlbʁoːk]) is a quarter of Hamburg, Germany, in the borough of Hamburg-Mitte. It is located on the southeastern border of the borough adjacent to the borough of Bergedorf. Billbrook is located in a swamp area near the Elbe and Bille rivers, which is described by the name, meaning Brook (Bruchwald, carr) at the river Bille. 1,869 people lived in Billbrook in 2023.

Billbrook borders the quarters of Horn, Billstedt, Billwerder, Moorfleet and Rothenburgsort.

== History ==
On the end of the 19th century the area was raised with sand in order to facilitate the construction of buildings. The area was accessed planfully by a network of long, straight streets, which is uncharacteristic for Hamburg. Five wide channels (Tiefstack- and Billbrookkanal, Tidekanal, Industriekanal and Moorfleeter Kanal) are used for drainage and are also navigable by ships with shallow draft.

Today, Billbrook is largely an industrial area, the second largest in Hamburg. There are only two small residential areas. The Tiefstack power plant is also located here. It was built from 1914 to 1917.

== Politics ==
These are the results of Billbrook in the Hamburg state election:

State Election	SPD	AfD	Greens	CDU	Left	FDP	Others
2020	33,8 %	23,8 %	11,5 %	8,0 %	5,8 %	3,5 %	13,6 %
2015	49,4 %	13,3 %	4,1 %	10,6 %	8,9 %	4,8 %	8,9 %
2011	51,4 %	–	6,5 %	16,9 %	8,9 %	2,0 %	14,3 %
2008	37,2 %	–	6,2 %	29,2 %	15,9 %	4,4 %	7,1 %
2004	37,1 %	–	6,7 %	47,5 %	–	1,8 %	10,9 %
2001	39,4 %	–	3,2 %	22,6 %	0,0 %	0,6 %	34,2 %
1997	48,8 %	–	5,9 %	18,0 %	0,0 %	1,2 %	26,1 %
1993	52,3 %	–	7,3 %	15,7 %	–	0,9 %	23,8 %
