= Philipp Heißner =

German politician (born 1988)

Member of the Hamburg Parliament
- Incumbent
- Assumed office 26 March 2025
- In office 2 March 2015 – 18 March 2020

Personal details
- Born: 6 June 1988 (age 37)
- Party: Christian Democratic Union (since 2009)

Philipp Heißner (born 6 June 1988) is a German politician. He has been a member of the Hamburg Parliament since 2025, having previously served from 2015 to 2020. From 2019 to 2022, he served as chairman of the Young Union in Hamburg.
