= Richard Seelmaecker =

German politician (born 1973)

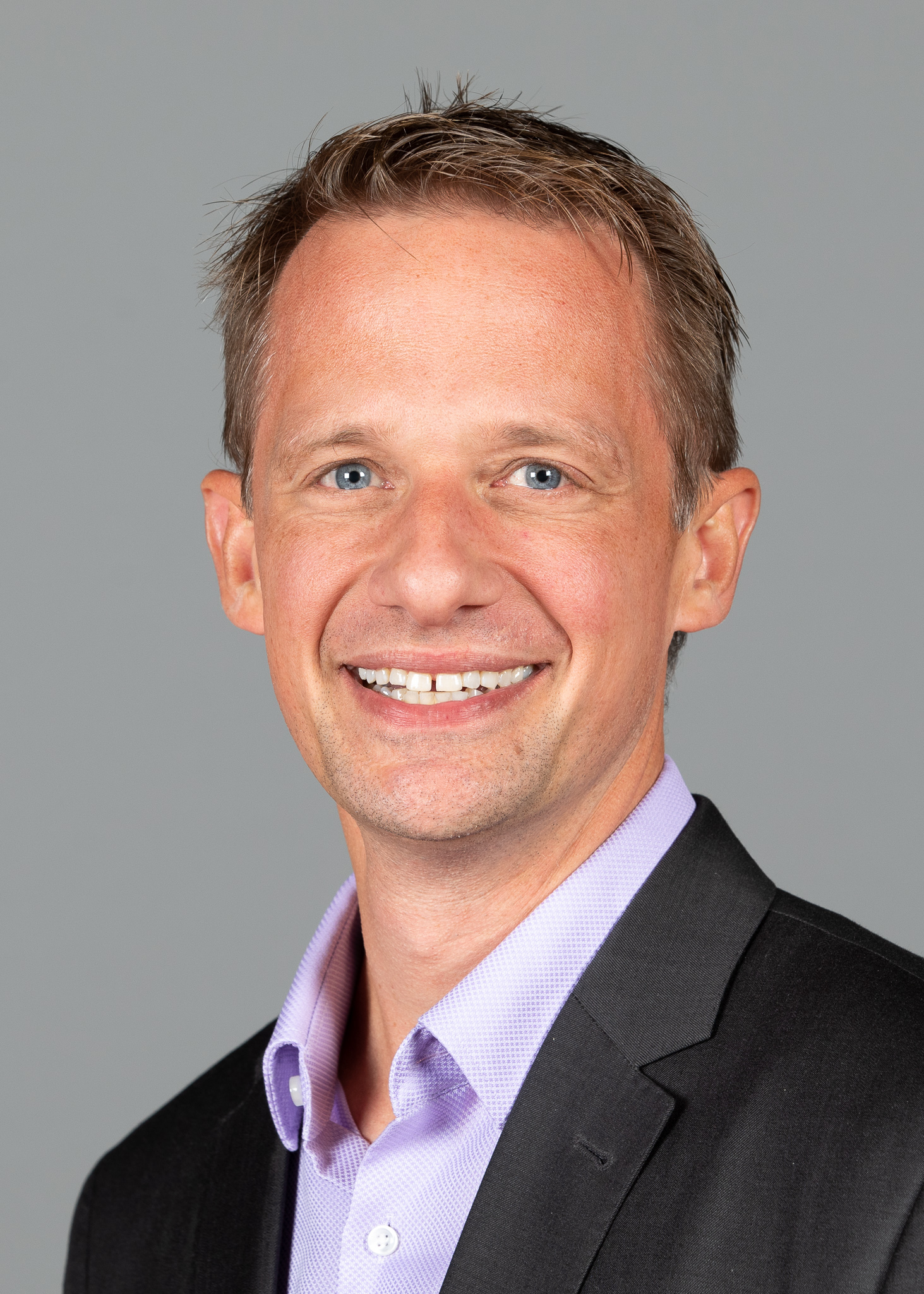
- Seelmaecker in 2018

Member of the Hamburg Parliament
- Incumbent
- Assumed office 2 March 2015
- In office 12 March 2008 – 7 March 2011

Personal details
- Born: 12 February 1973 (age 53) Hamburg
- Party: Christian Democratic Union (since 1995)

Richard Seelmaecker (born 12 February 1973 in Hamburg) is a German politician. He has been a member of the Hamburg Parliament since 2015, having previously served from 2008 to 2011. From 2004 to 2008, he was a borough councillor of Hamburg-Nord.
