= Roland Heintze =

German politician

Roland Heintze (born 29 April 1973) is a German politician for the Christian Democratic Union of Germany (CDU).

== Life and politics ==
Heintze was born in 1973 in Hamburg and became a member of the CDU in 1994. He was a member of the Hamburg Parliament from 2004 to 2015.

From 2015 Heintze served as chairman of the CDU in Hamburg. In December 2018, he presided over the CDU’s national convention in Hamburg.

In 2020, Heintze proposed Christoph Ploß as candidate to succeed him as chairman.

== Other activities ==
- Donner & Reuschel, Member of the Advisory Board
- Hamburgische Regenbogenstiftung, Member of the Board of Trustees
