= Dirk Fischer (politician) =

German politician

- Fischer in 2014

Member of the Bundestag; from Hamburg
- In office 4 November 1980 – 24 October 2017
- Preceded by: Multi-member district
- Succeeded by: Christoph Ploß
- Constituency: State list (1980–1987); Hamburg-Nord (1987–1998); State list (1998–2009); Hamburg-Nord (2009–2017)

Member of the Hamburg Parliament
- In office 14 April 1970 – 5 February 1981
- Preceded by: Multi-member district
- Succeeded by: Helga Mack
- Constituency: State list

Personal details
- Born: Dirk Erik Fischer; 29 November 1943 (age 82) Bevensen, Germany
- Party: Christian Democratic Union
- Education: University of Hamburg
- Awards: German Order of Merit First Class (1994)

Dirk Fischer (born 29 November 1943) is a German politician. He is a member of the Christian Democratic Union (CDU) party. Between 1980 and 2017, he was an MP of the German Bundestag as the representative for Hamburg-Nord constituency. For many years, Fischer was transport policy spokesman of the CDU/CSU parliamentary faction. He is also president of Hamburg Football Association (HFV) and a board member of German Football Association (DFB).

== Early life and education ==
Fischer was born in Bevensen. After high school, Fischer served as a Bundeswehr soldier from 1964 to 1966. Afterwards he studied law at the University of Hamburg. After graduation in 1978 he worked at Hamburg company Möller + Förster until 1986. Since 1982, he is also licensed as a lawyer.

== Political career ==
Fischer was a member of Hamburgische Bürgerschaft, the parliament of Hamburg, from 1971 to 5 February 1981.

From 1980, Fischer was a member of the German Bundestag. From 1989 to 2014 he was also transport policy spokesman of the CDU/CSU parliamentary group. From 1992 to 2007 he was chairman of CDU Hamburg. From 1994 to 2014 Fischer was chairman of the Hamburg state group in the Bundestag.

In the 18th legislation period, Fischer was a member of the Committee on Transport and Digital Infrastructure.

In October 2016, Fischer announced that he would not stand in the 2017 federal elections but instead resign from active politics by the end of the parliamentary term.

== Other activities ==
Since November 2007, Fischer has been serving as president of Hamburg Football Association (HFV) and a board member of German Football Association (DFB). He is also a member of the Board of Trustees of the Federal Chancellor Helmut Schmidt Foundation.

== Recognition ==
In September 1994, Fischer received the German Order of Merit First Class.

== See also ==
- Hamburg Parliament
- Erck Rickmers
- Johannes Versmann
