= 2015 Hamburg state election =

State election in Hamburg, Germany

- 15 February 2015

All 121 seats in the Hamburg Parliament 61 seats needed for a majority
- Turnout: 3,530,097 (56.5%) ▼0.8%
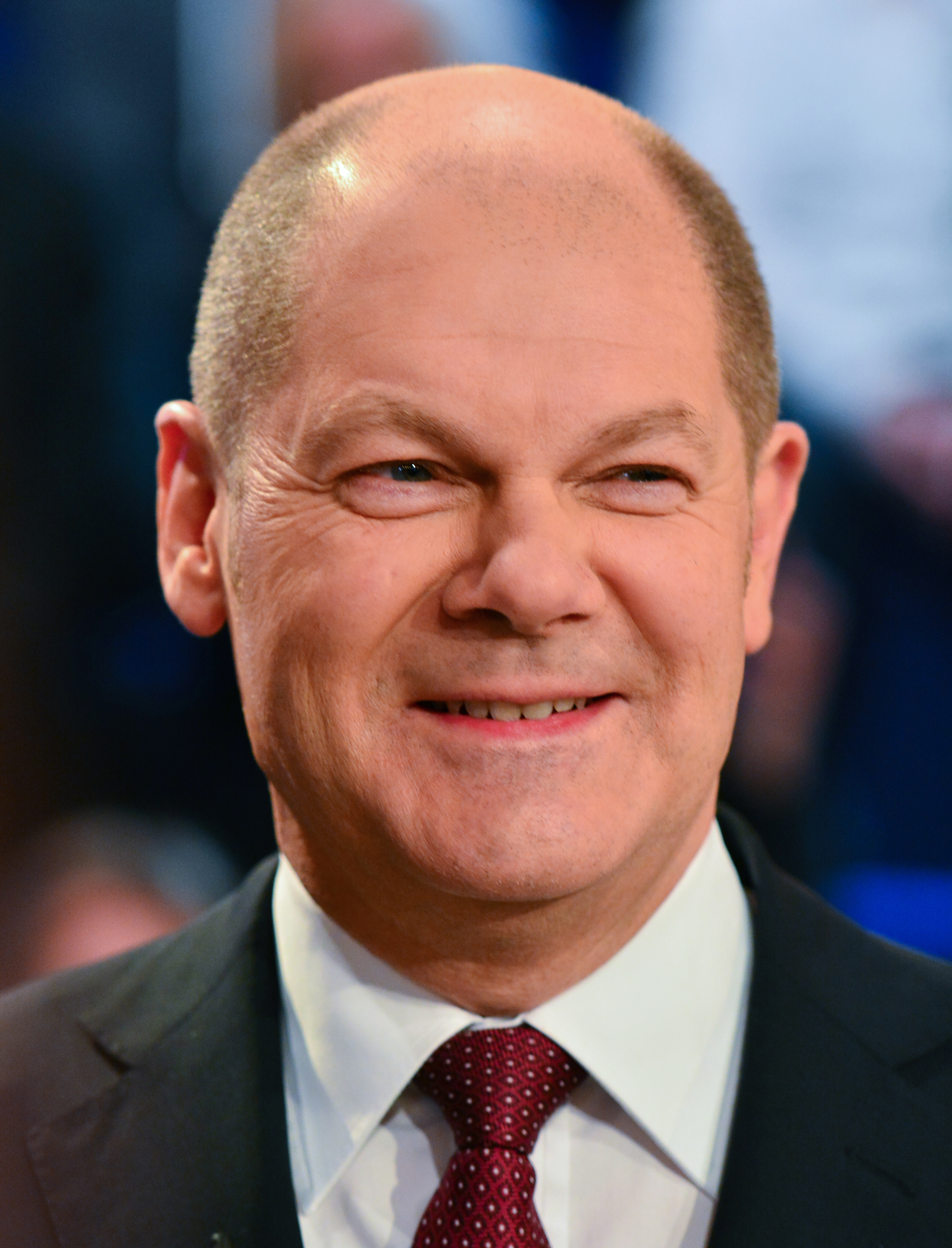

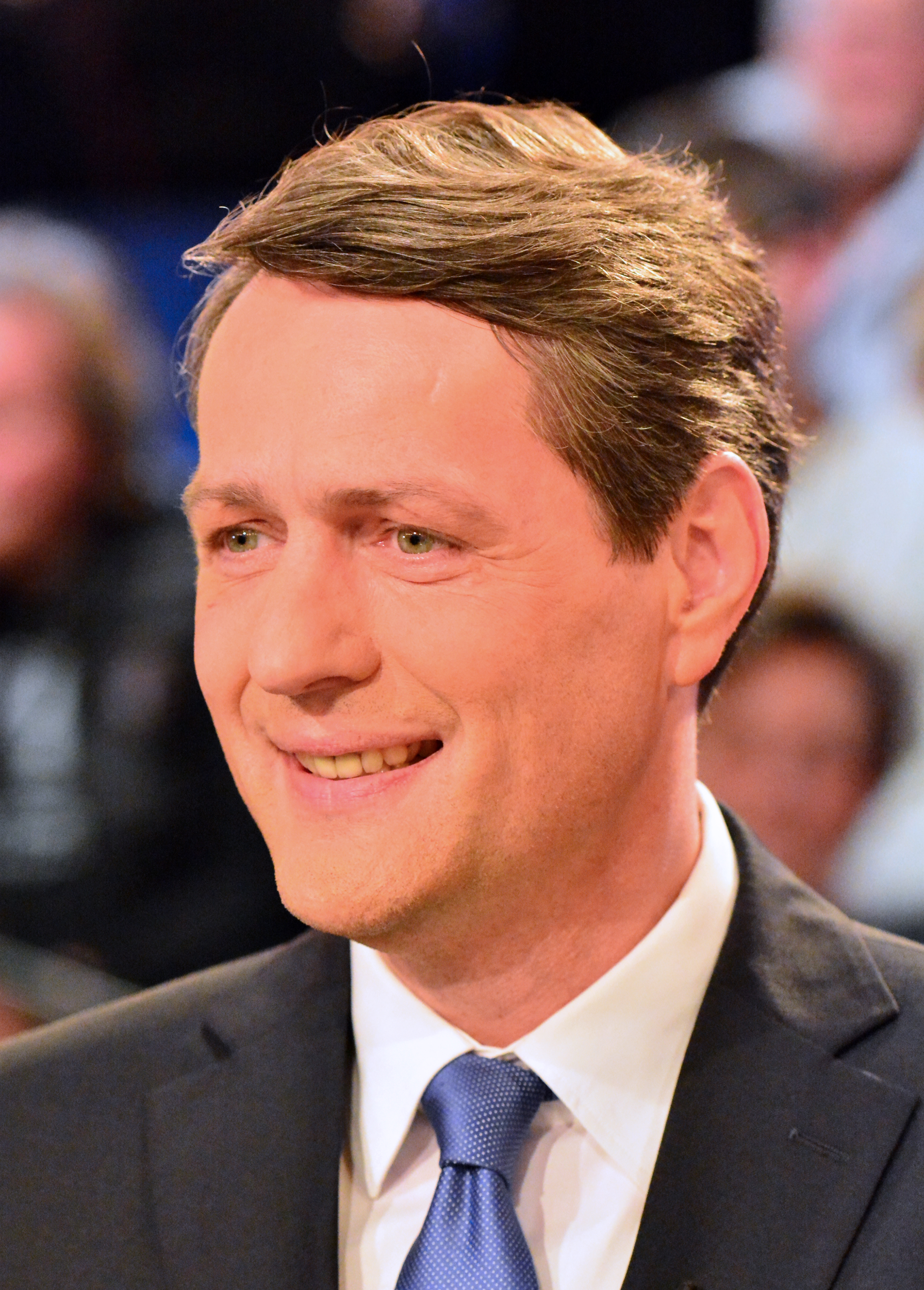

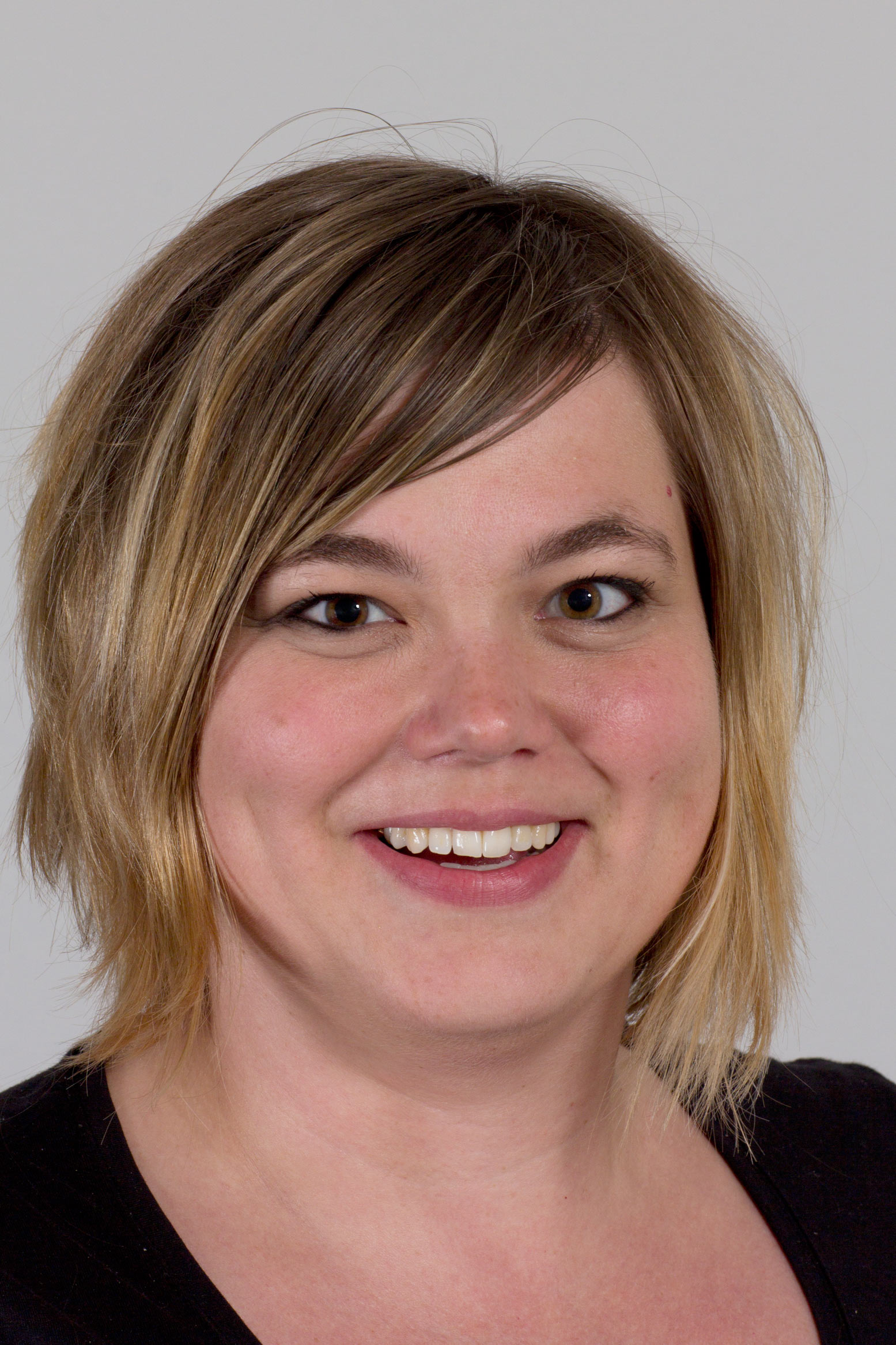

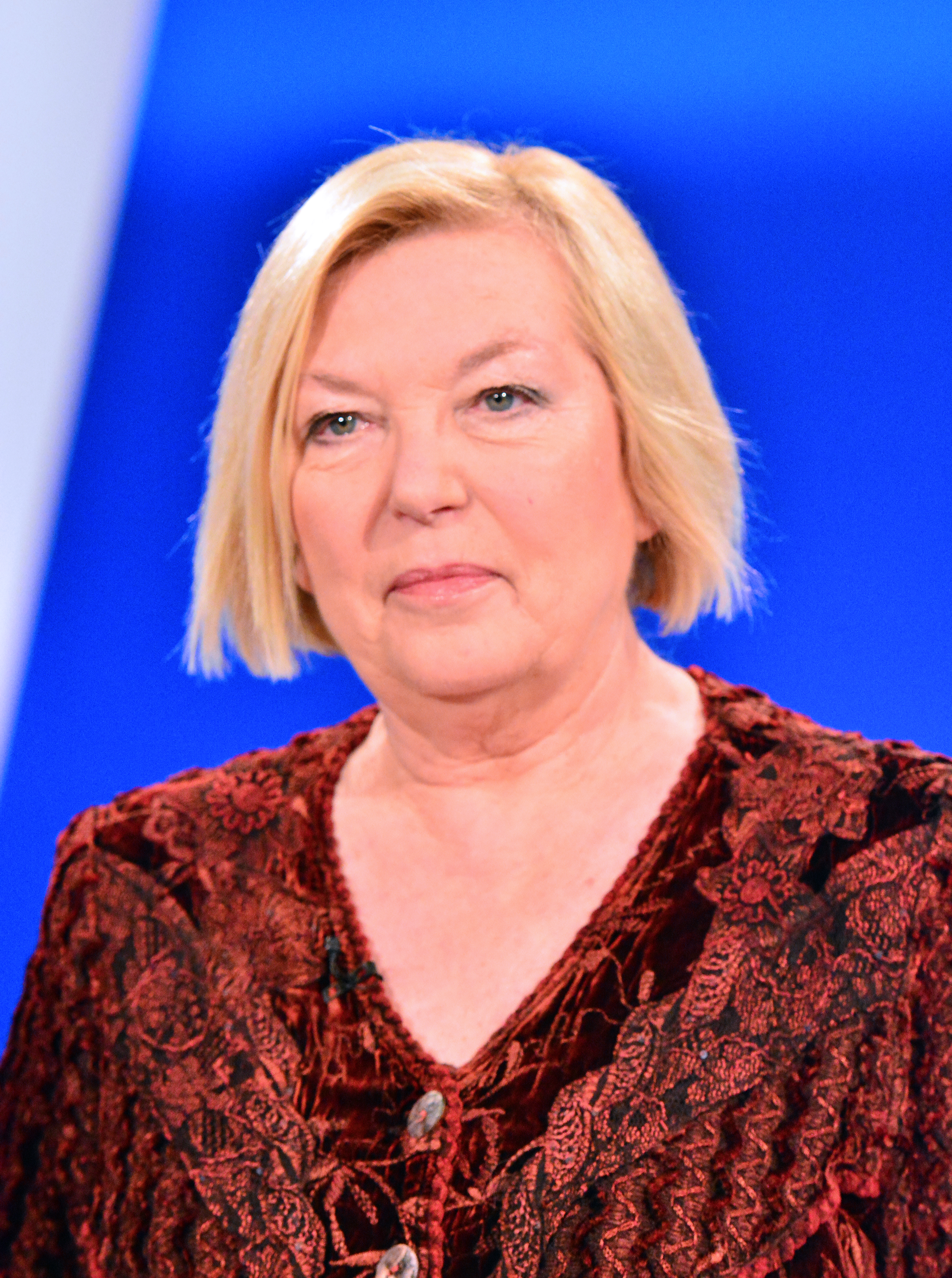

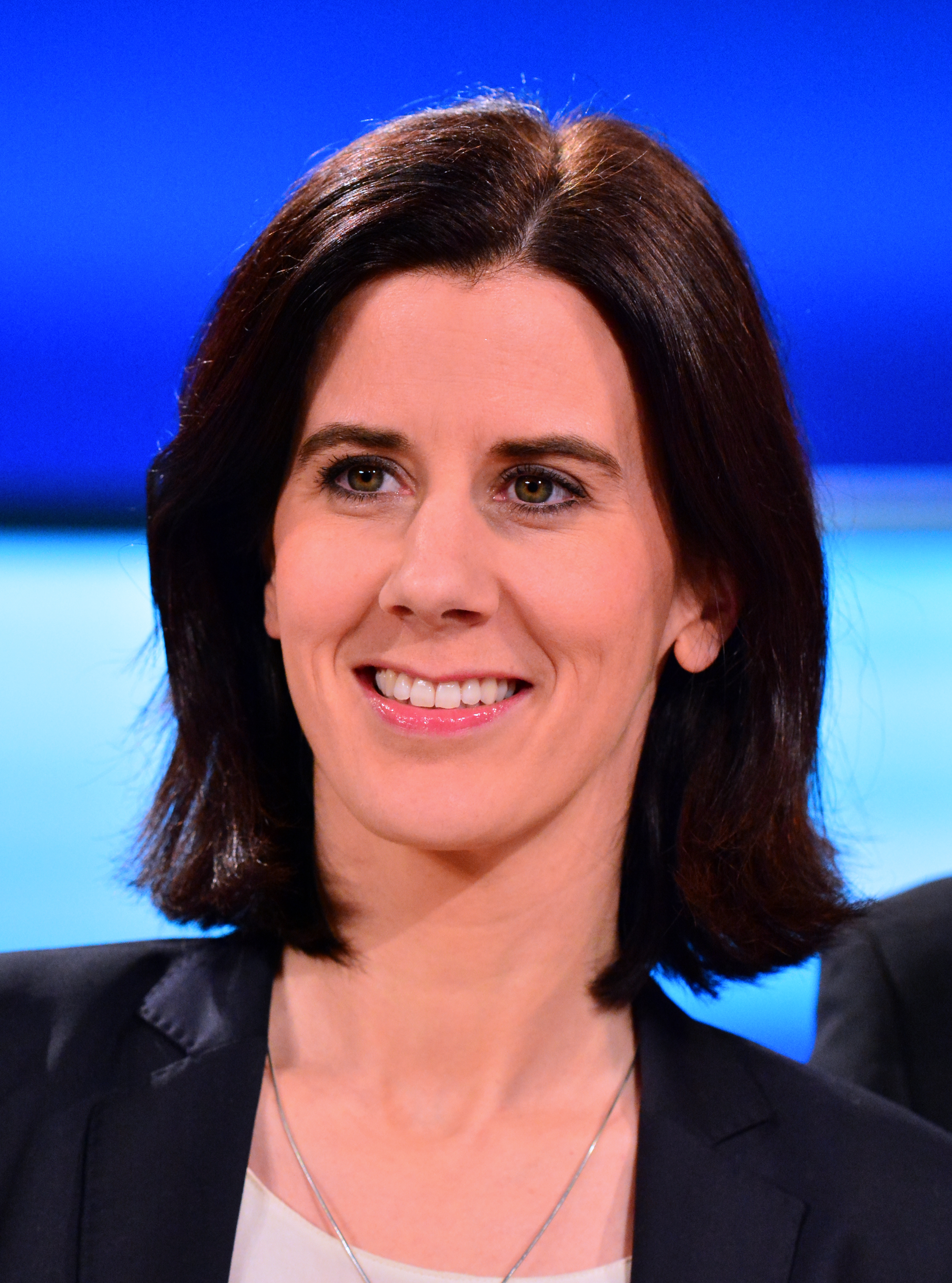

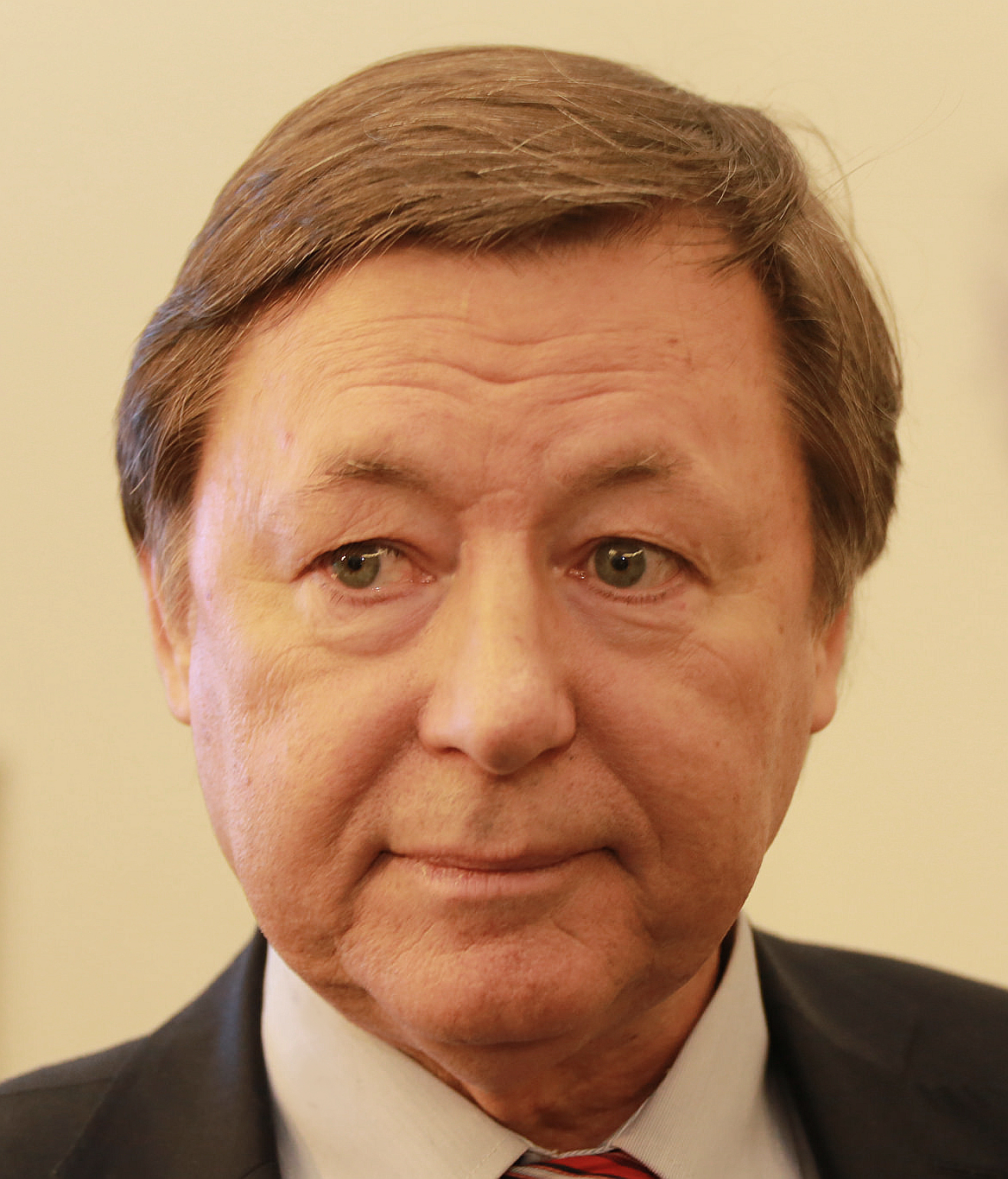
	First party	Second party	Third party
Leader	Olaf Scholz	Dietrich Wersich	Katharina Fegebank
Party	SPD	CDU	Greens
Last election	62 seats, 48.4%	28 seats, 21.9%	14 seats, 11.2%
Seats won	58	20	15
Seat change	▼4	▼8	▲1
Popular vote	1,611,274	561,377	432,713
Percentage	45.6%	15.9%	12.3%
Swing	▼2.8%	▼6.0%	▲1.1%
	Fourth party	Fifth party	Sixth party
Leader	Dora Heyenn	Katja Suding	Jörn Kruse
Party	Left	FDP	AfD
Last election	8 seats, 6.4%	9 seats, 6.7%	Did not exist
Seats won	11	9	8
Seat change	▲3	0	▲8
Popular vote	300,567	262,157	214,833
Percentage	8.5%	7.4%	6.1%
Swing	▲2.1%	▲0.7%	New party
Mayor before election
Olaf Scholz
SPD
Elected Mayor
Olaf Scholz
SPD

The 2015 Hamburg state election was held on 15 February 2015 to elect the members of the 21st Hamburg Parliament. The incumbent Social Democratic Party (SPD) government led by First Mayor Olaf Scholz lost its majority. The SPD subsequently formed a coalition government with The Greens, and Scholz continued in office.

== Parties ==
The table below lists parties represented in the 20th Hamburg Parliament.

Name		Ideology	Leader(s)	2011 result	
Name		Ideology	Leader(s)	Votes (%)	Seats
SPD	Social Democratic Party of Germany; Sozialdemokratische Partei Deutschlands	Social democracy	Olaf Scholz	48.42%	62 / 121
CDU	Christian Democratic Union of Germany; Christlich Demokratische Union Deutschlands	Christian democracy	Dietrich Wersich	21.88%	28 / 121
Grüne	Alliance 90/The Greens; Bündnis 90/Die Grünen	Green politics	Katharina Fegebank	11.16%	14 / 121
FDP	Free Democratic Party; Freie Demokratische Partei	Classical liberalism	Katja Suding	6.65%	9 / 121
Linke	The Left; Die Linke	Democratic socialism	Dora Heyenn	6.40%	8 / 121

== Opinion polling ==
Polling firm	Fieldwork date	Sample size	SPD	CDU	Grüne	FDP	Linke	AfD	Others	Lead
2015 state election	15 Feb 2015	–	45.6	15.9	12.3	7.4	8.5	6.1	4.2	29.7
Forschungsgruppe Wahlen	11–12 Feb 2015	1,113	47	17	12	6	8.5	5	4.5	30
Forschungsgruppe Wahlen	3–5 Feb 2015	1,176	45	19	11	6	9.5	5	4.5	26
Infratest dimap	3–4 Feb 2015	1,001	46	18	11	5.5	9	5.5	5	28
Infratest dimap	23–27 Jan 2015	1,000	44	20	13	5	9	6	3	24
Universität Hamburg	5–21 Jan 2015	235	44.6	22.6	14.9	2.8	9.1	2.9	3.2	22.0
INSA	7–13 Jan 2015	1,000	42	23	14	4	7	6	4	19
Infratest dimap	9–12 Jan 2015	1,000	43	22	14	4	8	5	4	21
Universität Hamburg	5 Nov–23 Dec 2014	511	39.7	20.6	21.8	2.8	8.9	3.2	3.0	19.1
mafo.de	15 Dec 2014	500	42	22	14	2	8	6	6	20
Infratest dimap	5–9 Dec 2014	1,005	43	24	14	2	9	4	4	19
GESS	24 Oct–3 Nov 2014	1,002	45	27	11	2	7	4	4	18
mafo.de	9 May 2014	500	38.5	22.6	13.7	2.9	7.8	5.8	8.7	15.9
GESS	27 Jan–4 Feb 2014	1,003	48	24	11	3	8	?	?	24
Infratest dimap	9–13 Jan 2014	1,000	42	25	13	5	9	3	3	17
Universität Hamburg	8 May–24 Jun 2013	636	43	21	18	4	8	–	2	22
GESS	29 Jan–4 Feb 2013	1,003	51	23	13	2	4	–	5	28
Universität Hamburg	16 Apr–3 Aug 2012	468	42.0	20.8	21.5	4.4	4.5	–	6.9	21.2
GESS	7–14 Feb 2012	1,006	52	21	12	2	5	–	?	31
Infratest dimap	13–18 Jan 2012	1,000	51	20	14	3	4	–	8	31
YouGov	21 Nov–2 Dec 2011	1,031	44	21	13	3	7	–	12	23
Psephos	1–9 Jun 2011	1,003	47	20	14	7	7	–	5	27
2011 state election	20 Feb 2011	–	48.4	21.9	11.2	6.7	6.4	–	5.5	26.5

== Election result ==
Summary of the 15 February 2015 election results for the Hamburg Parliament
Party	Statewide list			Constituency list			Total seats	+/–
Party	Votes	%	Seats	Votes	%	Seats	Total seats	+/–
Social Democratic Party (SPD)	1,611,274	45.64	23	1,440,847	41.02	35	58	▼4
Christian Democratic Union (CDU)	561,377	15.90	2	690,479	19.66	18	20	▼8
Alliance 90/The Greens (Grüne)	432,713	12.26	2	515,900	14.69	13	15	▲1
The Left (Linke)	300,567	8.51	7	325,909	9.28	4	11	▲3
Free Democratic Party (FDP)	262,157	7.43	8	222,736	6.34	1	9	0
Alternative for Germany (AfD)	214,833	6.09	8	217,144	6.18	0	8	New
Pirate Party Germany (Piraten)	54,802	1.55	0	65,358	1.86	0	0	0
Die PARTEI	31,710	0.90	0	5,278	0.15	0	0	0
New Liberals	18,464	0.52	0				0	New
Ecological Democratic Party	13,621	0.39	0	3,140	0.09	0	0	0
National Democratic Party	11,293	0.32	0	9,542	0.27	0	0	0
Pensioners Party	9,937	0.28	0				0	0
Hamburg Citizens' List	7,349	0.21	0				0	New
Independents (Note: Walter Scheuerl)				6,773	0.19	0	0	0
Citizens' Participation				3,174	0.09	0	0	New
HaraAlt				2,107	0.06	0	0	New
Human Economics Party				1,448	0.04	0	0	0
Social Politics				1,161	0.03	0	0	New
Why Not!				1,131	0.03	0	0	New
Total	3,530,097	100.00	50	3,512,127	100.00	71	121	–
Valid votes	3,530,097	99.42		3,512,127	99.41			
Invalid/blank votes	20,648	0.58		20,854	0.59			
Total votes	3,550,745	100.00		3,532,981	100.00			
Registered voters/turnout		56.5			56.5		▼0.8	

Popular Vote
SPD	45.64%
CDU	15.90%
B'90/GRÜNE	12.26%
DIE LINKE	8.51%
FDP	7.43%
AfD	6.09%
PIRATEN	1.55%
Other	2.62%

Bürgerschaft seats
SPD	47.93%
CDU	16.53%
B'90/GRÜNE	12.40%
DIE LINKE	9.09%
FDP	7.44%
AfD	6.61%

== See also ==
- Elections in Hamburg
- Hamburg state elections in the Weimar Republic
