= List of Bavarian People's Party politicians =

A list of notable politicians of the Bavarian People's Party:

== A ==
- Hans Adlhoch
- Alois Albert
- Ellen Ammann
- Anton Graf von Arco auf Valley

== B ==
- Johann Bär, de:Johann Bär
- Klara Barth
- Hermann Bauer, de:Hermann Bauer (Politiker, 1905)
- Eduard Baumer, de:Eduard Baumer
- Joseph Baumgartner
- Leonhard Baur, de:Leonhard Baur
- Michael Bayersdörfer, de:Michael Bayersdörfer
- Alois Berger, de:Alois Berger
- Rupert Berger, de:Rupert Berger (Politiker)
- Korad Beyerle, de:Konrad Beyerle
- Karl Bickleder
- Josef Böhm, de:Josef Böhm (Politiker, 1865)
- Otto Bohl
- Walter Boll, de:Walter Boll
- Felix Brandl, de:Felix Brandl
- Heinrich Brandl, de:Heinrich Brandl
- Alois Braun, de:Alois Braun (Widerstandskämpfer)
- August Bruch, de:August Bruch
- Eustach Bühner, de:Eustach Bühner

== D ==
- Franz Dauer, deFranz Dauer
- Hans Dauser, de:Hans Dauser
- Hans Demmelmeier
- Hans Dessauer sen., de:Hans Desauer sen.
- Kaspar Deutschenbaur
- Sebastian Diernreiter, de:Sebastian Diernreiter
- Johann Dietlein, de:Johann Dietlein
- Richard Dippold, de:Richard Dippold
- Karl Donderer, de:Karl Donderer
- Josef Donsberger, de:Josef Donsberger
- Franz Dölger, de:Franz Dölger
- Jakob Dörler, de:Jakob Dörler

== E ==
- Aloisia Eberle, de:Aloisia Eberle
- Hermann Eder, de:Hermann Eder
- Franz Xaver Eggersdorfer, de:Franz Xaver Eggersdorfer
- Hans Ehard
- Otto Eichenlaub, de:Otto Eichenlaub
- Isidor Eirainer, de:Isidor Eirainer
- Erich Emminger
- Karl Andreas Endres, de:Karl Andreas Endres
- Franz Ritter von Epp
- Georg Escherich

== F ==
- Franz Fackler, de:Franz Fackler
- Josef falermeier, de:Josef Faltermeier
- Alexander von Feilitzsch, de:Alexander von Feilitzsch
- Anton Feistle, de:Anton Feistle
- Conrad Fink
- Josef Fischer, de:Josef Fischer (Politiker, 1906)
- Karl Fischer, de:Karl Fischer (Politiker, 1904)
- Moritz von und zu Franckenstein, de:Moritz von und zu Franckenstein
- Karl von Freyberg, de:Karl von Freyberg (Politiker)
- Valentin Fröhlich, de:Valentin Fröhlich
- Johann Friedrich Fröhling, de:Johann Friedrich Fröhling
- Otto Frommknecht, de:Otto Frommknecht
- Philipp Funk, de:Philipp Funk
- Linus Funke, de:Linus Funke
- Franz Fux, de:Franz Fux (Landrat)

== G ==
- Josef Gallmeier, de:Josef Gallmeier
- Michael Gasteiger, de:Michael Gasteiger
- Georg Gehring, de:Georg Gehring (Politiker)
- Hans Geiselberger, de:Hans Geiselberger
- Franz Gerauer, de:Franz Gerauer (Politiker, 1869)
- Liborius Gerstenberger, de:Liborius Gerstenberger
- Franz Goldenberger, de:Franz Goldenberger
- Alfons Goppel
- Benno Graf, de:Benno Graf
- Otto Graf, de:Otto Graf (Politiker, 1894)
- Peter Graf, de:Peter Graf (Politiker, 1874)
- Josef Gräßl, de:Josef Gräßl
- Franziska Gröber, de:Franziska Gröber
- Georg Gromer, de:Georg Gromer
- Hubert Groß, de:Hubert Groß
- Franz Josef von Gruben
- Otto Gumrum, de:Otto Gumrum
- Josef Güttler, de:Josef Güttler

== H ==
- August Haas, de:August Haas (Jurist)
- Ludwig Hagenauer, de:Ludwig Hagenauer
- Hans Hagn, de:Hans Hagn
- Josef Hamberger, de:Josef Hamberger (Politiker, 1890)
- Heinrich Haug, de:Heinrich Haug
- Bendeikt Hebel, de:Benedikt Hebel
- Georg Heim, de:Georg Heim
- Heinrich Held
- Walter Heild, de:Walter Held (Politiker)
- Michael Helmerich, de:Michael Helmerich
- Franz Herbert, de:Franz Herbert
- Hans Herrmann, de:Hans Herrmann (Politiker, 1889)
- Friedrich Hilble, de:Friedrich Hilble
- Otto Hipp, de:Otto Hipp
- Benedikt Hirschenauer, de:Benedikt Hirschenauer
- Engelbert Hofmann, de:Engelbert Hofmann
- Hans-Otto Hofmann, de:Hans-Otto Hofmann
- Michael Horlacher, de:Michael Horlacher
- Alois Hundhammer
- Friedrich Huth, de:Friedrich Huth (Politiker)

== I ==
- Hans Imler, de:Hans Imler
- Martin Irl, de:Martin Irl

== J ==
- Josef Jaud, de:Josef Jaud

== K ==
- Karl Kahn, de:Karl Kahn
- Albert Kaifer, de:Albert Kaifer
- Fritz Kaiser, de:Fritz Kaiser (Politiker, 1901)
- Hugo Karpf, de:Hugo Karpf
- Josef Kastner, de:Josef Kastner (Politiker)
- Josef Kiefer, de:Josef Kiefer (Politiker)
- Wolfgang Klausner, de:Wolfgang Klausner
- Eduard Klug, de:Eduard Klug (Politiker)
- Eugen von Knilling
- Hans Knorr, de:Hans Knorr
- Gustav Kofler, de:Karl Gustav Kofler
- Heinrich Königbauer, de:Heinrich Königbauer
- Wilhelm Kopf, de:Wilhelm Kopf
- Hubert Korbacher, de:Hubert Korbacher
- Joseph Kratofiel, de:Joseph Kratofiel
- Wilhelm Krausneck, de:Wilhelm Krausneck

== L ==
- Franz Xaver Lang, de:Franz Xaver Lang (Politiker)
- Thusnelda Lang-Brumann, de:Thusnelda Lang-Brumann
- Wilhelm Laforet, de:Wilhelm Laforet
- Hans Lechner, de:Hans Lechner (Politiker, 1883)
- Leopold Lerch, de:Leopold Lerch
- Hugo Graf von und zu Lerchenfeld auf Köfering und Schönberg
- Hans Ritter von Lex
- Martin Loibl, de:Martin Loibl (Politiker, 1869)
- Michael Lukas, de:Michael Lukas (Politiker)

== M ==
- Andreas Maderer, de:Andreas Maderer
- Jakob Martin, de:Jakob Martin
- Franz Matt
- Sebastian Matzinger, de:Sebastian Matzinger
- Gabriel Mayer, de:Gabriel Mayer
- Wilhelm Mayer, de:Wilhelm Mayer (Politiker, 1874)
- Julis K. Mayr, de:Julius K. Mayr
- Martin Mayrock, de:Martin Mayrock
- Ernst Meier, de:Ernst Meier (Medienwissenschaftler)
- Georg Meixner, de:Georg Meixner
- Wilhelm Merck, de:Wilhelm Merck (Politiker)
- Hans Meyer, de:Hans Meyer (Philosoph)
- Friedrich von Moreau, de:Friedrich von Moreau
- Ferdinand Müller, de:Ferdinand Müller (Politiker, 1859)
- Josef Müller, de:Josef Müller (Politiker, 1898)
- Klaus Müller, de:Klaus Müller (Politiker, 1892)
- Nikolaus Müller

== N ==
- Wilhelm Nagengast, de:Wilhelm Nagengast
- Johann Wilhelm Naumann, de:Johann Wilhelm Naumann

== O ==
- Josef Oesterle, de:Josef Oesterle
- Eduard Orth
- Heinrich Osel, de:Heinrich Osel
- Josef Osterhuber, de:Josef Osterhuber
- Kaspar Ostler, de:Kaspar Ostler
- Heinrich Oswald, de:Heinrich Oswald (Politiker)
- Karl Ott, de:Karl Ott (Politiker)

== P ==
- Hans Pabstmann, de:Hans Pabstmann
- Joseph von Pestalozza, de:Joseph von Pestalozza
- Anton Pfeiffer, de:Anton Pfeiffer
- Kurt Pfister, de:Kurt Pfister (Historiker)
- Joseph Pfleger, de:Joseph Pfleger (Politiker, 1872)
- Ludwig Plank, de:Ludwig Plank
- Johann Pollinger, de:Johann Pollinger
- August Ponschab, de:August Ponschab
- Wolfgang Prechtl, de:Wolfgang Prechtl
- Alexander Prugger, de:Alexander Prugger

== Q ==
- Eugen Graf von Quadt zu Wykradt und Isny

== R ==
- Hans Räbel, de:Hans Räbel
- August Ramminger, de:August Ramminger
- Georg Rattel, de:Georg Rattel
- Hans Rauch
- Johann Baptist Rauch, de:Johann Baptist Rauch
- Sebastian Regler, de:Sebastian Regler
- Anton Reus, de:Anton Reus
- Max Rief, de:Max Rief
- Richard Ringelmann, de:Richard Ringelmann
- Josef Riß, de:Josef Riß
- Hans Ritter von Lex
- Alexander Rodenstock
- Adam Röder, de:Adam Röder (Politiker, 1869)
- Karl Rothmeier, de:Karl Rothmeier
- Alfred Rüttiger, de:Alfred Rüttinger

== S ==
- Franz Ludwig Sauer, de:Franz Ludwig Sauer
- Karl Scharnagl
- Fritz Schäffer
- Josef Schatz, de:Josef Schatz (Politiker, 1905)
- Georg Schätzel
- Josef Schefbeck, de:Josef Schefbeck
- Siegmund Scheupl, de:Siegmund Scheupl
- Carl Schirmer, de:Carl Schirmer
- Sebastian Schlittenbauer, de:Sebastian Schlittenbauer
- Alois Schlögl, de:Alois Schlögl
- Hans Schmelzle, de:Hans Schmelzle
- Karl Schmid, de:Karl Schmid (Politiker, 1883)
- August Schmidhuber, de:August Schmidhuber
- Franz Schmitt, de:Franz Schmitt (Politiker, 1865)
- Ludwig Schmitt, de:Ludwig Schmitt (Bezirksoberamtmann)
- Philipp Schmitt, de:Philipp Schmitt (Politiker)
- Therese Schmitt, de:Therese Schmitt
- Josef Schraml, de:Josef Schraml
- Josef Schwalber, de:Josef Schwalber
- Georg Schwarz, de:Georg Schwarz (Politiker, 1873)
- Rudolf Schwarzer, de:Rudolf Schwarzer (Politiker, 1879)
- Franz Xaxer Schweyer, de:Franz Xaver Schweyer
- Lorenz Sedlmayr, de:Lorenz Sedlmayr
- Rudolf Seefried, de:Rudolf Seefried
- Hanns Seidel
- Georg Seufert, de:Georg Seufert (Politiker, 1885)
- Josef Siben, de:Josef Siben
- Ludwig Siebert
- Max Solleder, de:Max Solleder
- Karl Friedrich Speck
- Georg Spenkuch, de:Georg Spenkuch
- August Spies, de:August Spies (Politiker)
- Karl Graf von Spreti
- Georg Stang, de:Georg Stang (Politiker, 1880)
- Michael Stapfer, de:Michael Stapfer
- Bernhard Stempfle, de:Bernhard Stempfle
- Albert Stenglein, de:Albert Stenglein
- Michael Sterzer, de:Michael Sterzer
- Hans Stimmer, de:Hans Stimmer
- Karl Stingl, de:Karl Stingl
- Alois Stinglwagner, de:Alois Stinglwagner
- Franz Xaver Strauß, de:Franz Xaver Strauß
- Paul Strenkert, de:Paul Strenkert
- Georg Stücklen, de:Georg Stücklen (Politiker, 1875)
- Joseph Sturm, de:Joseph Sturm (Politiker)
- Wilhelm Sturm, de:Wilhelm Sturm (Politiker)
- Josef Stürmann, de:Josef Stürmann
- Karl Stützel, de:Karl Stützel
- Bernhard Suttner, de:Bernhard Suttner (Politiker, 1907)

== T ==
- Eugen Taucher, de:Eugen Taucher
- Johann Thanbichler, de:Johann Thanbichler
- Andreas Tremmel, de:Andreas Tremmel
- Martin Trettenbach, de:Martin Trettenbach
- Karl Troßmannn, de:Karl Troßmann

== U ==
- Josef Ulrich, de:Josef Ulrich (Verwaltungsjurist)

== V ==
- Wilhelm Vielberth, de:Wilhelm Vielberth
- Theodor Viernstein, de:Theodor Viernstein

== W ==
- Carl Walterbach, de:Carl Walterbach
- Otto Weinkamm
- Alois Weinzier, de:Alois Weinzierl
- Georg Weinzierl, de:Georg Weinzierl
- Franz Weiß (politician, 1900) de:Franz Weiß (Politiker, 1900)
- Franz Xaver Weixler, de:Franz Xaver Weixler
- Rudolf Weydenhammer, de:Rudolf Weydenhammer
- Otto Widmann, de:Otto Widmann
- Anton Wiedemann, de:Anton Wiedemann (Politiker, 1892)
- Franz Wittmann, de:Franz Wittmann (Politiker)
- Franz Wittmann (politician), de:Franz Wittmann (Politiker, 1887)
- Julian Wittmann, de:Julian Wittmann
- Eugen Wolhaupter, de:Eugen Wohlhaupter
- Georg Wohlmuth, de:Georg Wohlmuth
- Johannes Wolf, de:Johannes Wolf (Politiker, 1885)
- Gustav Wölfel, de:Gustav Wölfel
- Gustav Wolff, de:Gustav Wolff (Politiker, 1894)
- Georg Wunderle, de:Georg Wunderle
- Adolf Wünstel, de:Adolf Wünstel
- Hans Wutzlhofer, de:Hans Wutzlhofer

== Z ==
- Franz Xaver Zahnbrecher, de:Franz Xaver Zahnbrecher
- Anton Zeißlein, de:Anton Zeißlein
- Marie Zettler
- Georg Zitzler, de:Georg Zitzler
- Josef Zott, de:Josef Zott
- Max Zwicknagl, de:Max Zwicknagl
