= List of participants in the fourth Merkel cabinet coalition negotiations =

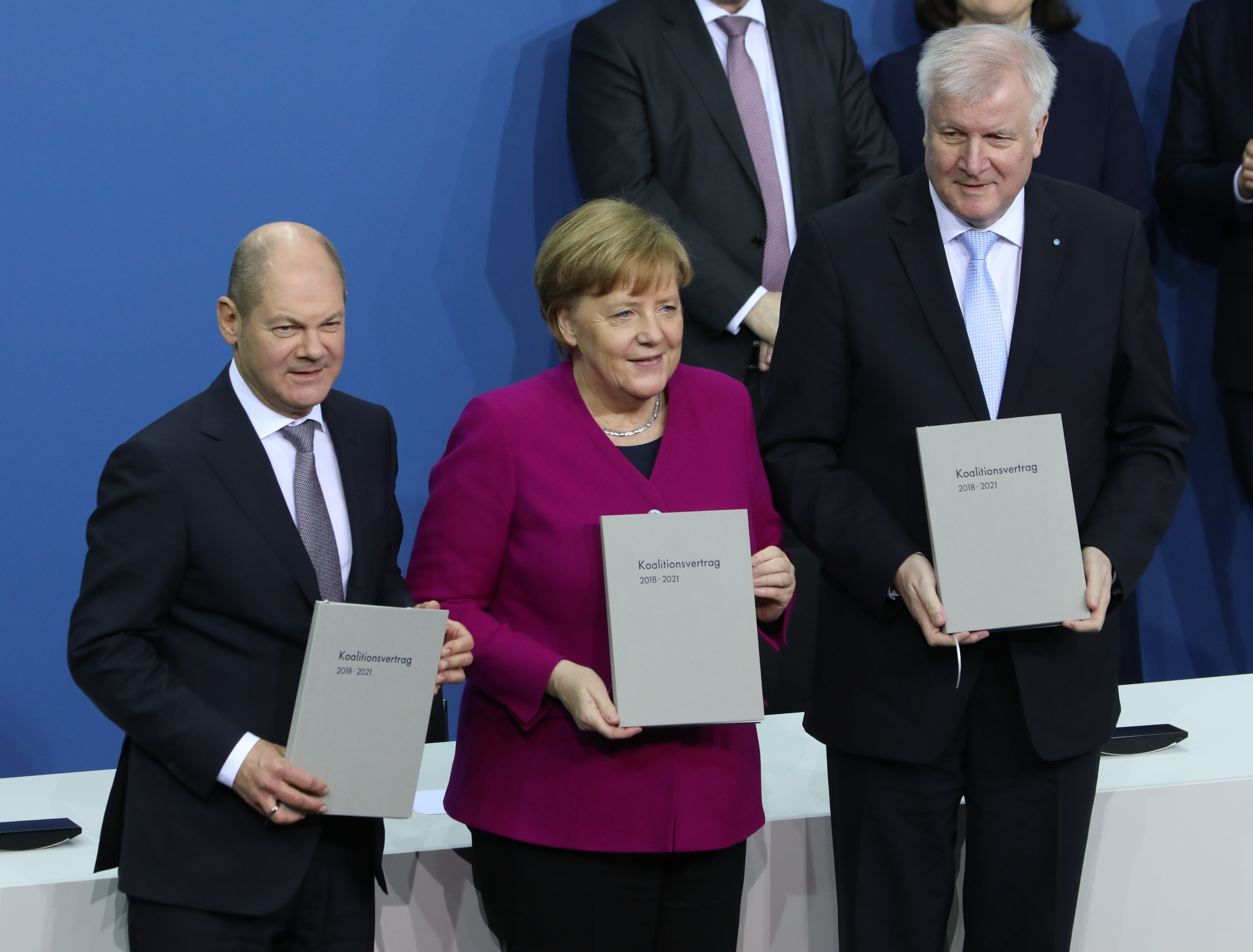
Signing of the coalition agreement for the 19th legislative period of the German Bundestag on 12 March 2018 in Berlin.

The list of participants in the coalition negotiations between CDU/CSU and SPD in 2018 lists the people who participated in the coalition negotiations between the parties after the 2017 German federal election.

Negotiations to form a grand coalition (Fourth Merkel cabinet) began on 28 January 2018. The activities mentioned as parliamentary state secretaries refer to the 18th legislative period of the German Bundestag.

== Round of three ==
- Angela Merkel, CDU Chairwoman and Acting Chancellor
- Horst Seehofer, CSU Chairman and Bavarian Minister-President
- Martin Schulz, SPD Chairman

== Small group ==
=== CDU ===
Representatives of the Christian Democratic Union of Germany:

- Angela Merkel, CDU Chairwoman and Acting Chancellor
- Volker Kauder, Chairman of the CDU/CSU parliamentary group in the Bundestag
- Peter Altmaier, Acting Federal Minister for Special Affairs, Head of the Federal Chancellery and Acting Federal Minister of Finance
- Volker Bouffier, Minister-President of Hesse, head of the CDU Hesse and deputy federal chairman of the CDU
- Michael Grosse-Brömer, First Parliamentary Secretary of the CDU/CSU parliamentary group in the Bundestag

=== CSU ===
Representatives of the Christian Social Union in Bavaria:

- Horst Seehofer, CSU Chairman and Bavarian Minister-President
- Alexander Dobrindt, Chair of the CSU state group in the Bundestag
- Andreas Scheuer, General Secretary of the CSU
- Markus Blume, Deputy General Secretary of the CSU

=== SPD ===
Representatives of the Social Democratic Party of Germany:

- Martin Schulz, SPD Chairman
- Andrea Nahles, Chairwoman of the SPD parliamentary group in the Bundestag
- Lars Klingbeil, General Secretary of the SPD
- Malu Dreyer, Minister-President of Rhineland-Palatinate and Deputy Chairwoman of the SPD
- Manuela Schwesig, Minister-President of Mecklenburg-Vorpommern and Deputy Chairwoman of the SPD
- Olaf Scholz, First Mayor of Hamburg, head of the SPD Hamburg and deputy chairman of the SPD

== Large group ==
=== CDU ===
- Angela Merkel, CDU Chairwoman and Acting Chancellor
- Volker Kauder, Chairman of the CDU/CSU parliamentary group in the Bundestag
- Peter Altmaier, Acting Federal Minister for Special Affairs, Head of the Federal Chancellery and Acting Federal Minister of Finance
- Volker Bouffier, Minister-President of Hesse, head of the CDU Hesse and deputy federal chairman of the CDU
- Michael Grosse-Brömer, First Parliamentary Secretary of the CDU/CSU parliamentary group in the Bundestag
- Bernd Althusmann MdL, Chairman of CDU Lower Saxony
- Helge Braun, Member of the Bundestag, Minister of State
- Ralph Brinkhaus MdB, Deputy Chairman of the CDU/CSU Parliamentary Group
- Daniel Caspary MEP, Chairman of the CDU/CSU Group in the European Parliament
- Gitta Connemann MdB, Deputy Chairwoman of the CDU/CSU Parliamentary Group
- Hermann Gröhe MdB, Member of the CDU Federal Executive Committee, Federal Minister
- Monika Grütters MdB, Member of the CDU Presidium, Minister of State
- Daniel Günther MdL, advisory member of the CDU Presidium, Minister-President of the State government of Schleswig-Holstein
- Stephan Harbarth MdB, Deputy Chairman of the CDU/CSU Parliamentary Group
- Reiner Haseloff MdL, advisory member of the CDU Presidium, Minister-President of Saxony-Anhalt
- Christian Hirte MdB, Deputy Chairman of the CDU/CSU Parliamentary Group
- Julia Klöckner MdL, Deputy Chairwoman of the CDU
- Vincent Kokert MdL, State Chairman of the CDU Mecklenburg-Vorpommern
- Annegret Kramp-Karrenbauer MdL, Member of the CDU Presidium, Minister-President of the Saarland
- Michael Kretschmer, advisory member of the CDU presidium, Minister-President of Saxony
- Armin Laschet MdL, Deputy Chairman of the CDU, Minister-President of North Rhine-Westphalia
- Karl-Josef Laumann, member of the CDU presidium
- Katja Leikert MdB, Deputy Chairwoman of the CDU/CSU Parliamentary Group
- Ursula von der Leyen MdB, Deputy Chairwoman of the CDU, acting Federal Minister of Defence
- Carsten Linnemann MdB, member of the CDU Federal Executive Committee
- Thomas de Maizière MdB, Member of the CDU Presidium, acting Federal Minister of the Interior
- Nadine Schön MdB, Deputy Chairwoman of the CDU/CSU Parliamentary Group
- Jens Spahn MdB, Member of the CDU Presidium, Parliamentary State Secretary
- Thomas Strobl, Deputy Chairman of the CDU
- Arnold Vaatz MdB, Deputy Chairman of the CDU/CSU Parliamentary Group
- Johann Wadephul MdB, Deputy Chairman of the CDU/CSU Parliamentary Group
- Sabine Weiss MdB, member of the CDU Federal Executive Committee
- Annette Widmann-Mauz MdB, Member of the CDU Federal Executive Committee, Parliamentary State Secretary

=== SPD ===
- Martin Schulz, SPD Chairman
- Andrea Nahles, Chairman of the SPD Bundestag fraktion
- Lars Klingbeil, General Secretary of the SPD
- Carsten Schneider, First Parliamentary Secretary of the SPD parliamentary group in the Bundestag
- Malu Dreyer, Minister-President of Rhineland-Palatinate and Deputy Chairwoman of the SPD
- Natascha Kohnen, State Chairwoman of the SPD Bavaria and Deputy Chairwoman of the SPD
- Thorsten Schäfer-Gümbel, State Chairman of the SPD Hesse and Deputy Chairman of the SPD
- Olaf Scholz, First Mayor of Hamburg, head of the SPD Hamburg and deputy chairman of the SPD
- Manuela Schwesig, Minister-President of the state government of Mecklenburg-Vorpommern and Deputy Chairwoman of the SPD
- Ralf Stegner, chairman of the SPD parliamentary group in the Schleswig-Holstein state parliament and deputy chairman of the SPD
- Stephan Weil, Minister-President of Lower Saxony and Chairman of the SPD Lower Saxony
- Anke Rehlinger, Saarland Minister of Economic Affairs
- Michael Groschek, Chairman of the SPD North Rhine-Westphalia
- Katarina Barley, Acting Federal Minister for Family Affairs, Senior Citizens, Women and Youth and Acting Federal Minister for Labour and Social Affairs
- Sigmar Gabriel, acting Federal Foreign Minister
- Barbara Hendricks, acting Federal Minister for the Environment
- Heiko Maas, acting Federal Justice Minister
- Aydan Özoğuz, Minister of State to the Federal Chancellor
- Brigitte Zypries, acting Federal Minister for Economic Affairs and Energy
- Martin Dulig, Saxon State Minister for Economic Affairs, Labour and Transport and Chairman of the SPD Saxony
- Udo Bullmann, MEP and member of the party executive committee responsible for the European Union
- Dietmar Nietan, Member of Parliament and Federal Treasurer of the SPD
- Eva Högl, MdB
- Leni Breymaier, MdB and Chairwoman of the SPD Baden-Württemberg
- Christine Lambrecht, MdB
- Katja Mast, MdB
- Hubertus Heil, MdB and member of the SPD party executive committee
- Matthias Miersch, MdB and member of the SPD party executive committee
- Klara Geywitz, Member of the Landtag of Brandenburg and member of the SPD party executive committee
- Svenja Schulze, General Secretary of the SPD NRW
- Doris Ahnen, Rhineland-Palatinate State Minister for Finance
- Katja Pähle, Chairwoman of the SPD parliamentary group in Saxony-Anhalt
- Carsten Sieling, President of the Senate and Mayor of the Free Hanseatic City of Bremen
- Dietmar Woidke, Minister-President of Brandenburg and Chairman of the SPD Brandenburg
- Michael Müller, Governing Mayor of Berlin and Chairman of the SPD Berlin

== Steering group ==
=== CDU ===
- Peter Altmaier, Acting Federal Minister for Special Tasks, Head of the Federal Chancellery of Germany and Acting Federal Minister of Finance
- Helge Braun, Minister of State at the Federal Chancellery
- Michael Grosse-Brömer, First Parliamentary Secretary of the CDU/CSU parliamentary group in the Bundestag

=== CSU ===
- Andreas Scheuer, General Secretary of the CSU
- Stefan Müller, parliamentary managing director of the CSU state group

=== SPD ===
- Lars Klingbeil, General Secretary of the SPD
- Carsten Schneider, First Parliamentary Secretary of the SPD parliamentary group in the Bundestag

== Working groups ==
Eighteen working groups were formed with each group being led by its chief negotiator.

=== Europe ===
Chief negotiators: Peter Altmaier (CDU), Alexander Dobrindt (CSU), Martin Schulz (SPD)

==== Other members ====
===== CDU =====
- Daniel Caspary
- Gunther Krichbaum
- Michael Stübgen
- David McAllister
- Lucia Puttrich

===== CSU =====
- Manfred Weber
- Florian Hahn
- Beate Merk

===== SPD =====
- Achim Post (Co-Chair), Member of the German Bundestag and Secretary General of the Party of European Socialists (SPE)
- Jens Geier (Co-Chair), MEP and Chair of the German Group within the parliamentary group
- Sylvia-Yvonne Kaufmann
- Constanze Krehl
- Christine Lambrecht
- Jo Leinen

=== Economy and reducing bureaucracy ===
Chief negotiators: Thomas Strobl (CDU), Alexander Dobrindt (CSU), Brigitte Zypries (SPD)

==== Other members ====
===== CDU =====
- Joachim Pfeiffer
- Mathias Middelberg
- Nicole Hoffmeister-Kraut
- Mike Mohring
- Rüdiger Kruse

===== CSU =====
- Peter Ramsauer
- Andreas Lenz
- Karl Holmeier

===== SPD =====
- Dietmar Woidke (Co-Chairman), Minister president of Brandenburg and Chairman of the SPD Brandenburg
- Martin Dulig
- Matthias Machnig
- Sabine Poschmann
- Rolf Bösinger

=== Transport and infrastructure ===
Chief negotiators: Daniel Günther (CDU), Alexander Dobrindt (CSU), Sören Bartol (SPD)

==== Other members ====
===== CDU =====
- Arnold Vaatz
- Steffen Bilger
- Patrick Schnieder
- Enak Ferlemann
- Oliver Wittke

===== CSU =====
- Ulrich Lange
- Daniela Ludwig
- Karl Holmeier

===== SPD =====
- Alexander Schweitzer (Co-Chair), Chairman of the SPD parliamentary group in the Landtag of Rhineland-Palatinate
- Andreas Rieckhof
- Anke Rehlinger
- Kirsten Lühmann
- Kathrin Schneider
- Martin Burkert

=== Work, social affairs and pensions ===
Chief negotiators: Karl-Josef Laumann (CDU), Stephan Stracke (CSU), Andrea Nahles (SPD)

==== Other members ====
===== CDU =====
- Carsten Linnemann
- Sabine Weiss
- Peter Weiß
- Ralf Brauksiepe
- Manfred Grund

===== SPD =====
- Carsten Sieling (Co-Chair), President of the Senate and Mayor of the Free Hanseatic City of Bremen
- Sabine Bätzing-Lichtenthäler
- Kerstin Tack
- Anette Kramme
- Gabriele Lösekrug-Möller
- Kerstin Griese

=== Families, women, youth and senior citizens, including the promotion of democracy ===
Chief negotiators: Annegret Kramp-Karrenbauer (CDU), Angelika Niebler (CSU), Katarina Barley (SPD)

==== Other members ====
===== CDU =====
- Marcus Weinberg
- Nadine Schön
- Otto Wulff
- Paul Ziemiak
- Annegret Kramp-Karrenbauer

===== CSU =====
- Emilia Müller
- Paul Lehrieder
- Silke Launert

===== SPD =====
- Katja Mast (Co-Chair), MdB
- Sönke Rix
- Caren Marks
- Melanie Leonhard
- Elke Ferner

=== Education and Research ===
Chief negotiators: Michael Kretschmer (CDU), Stephan Müller (CSU), Manuela Schwesig (SPD)

==== Other members ====
===== CDU =====
- Ralf Alexander Lorz
- Stefan Kaufmann
- Thomas Rachel
- Karin Prien
- Tankred Schipanski

===== CSU =====
- Ludwig Spaenle
- Albert Rupprecht
- Wolfgang Stefinger

===== SPD =====
- Hubertus Heil (Co-Chair), MdB
- Svenja Schulze
- Oliver Kaczmarek
- Eva Quante-Brandt
- Ties Rabe
- Ernst Dieter Rossmann

=== Digital ===
Chief negotiators: Monika Grütters (CDU), Dorothee Bär (CSU), Michael Roth (SPD)

==== Other members ====
===== CDU =====
- Nadine Schön
- Thomas Jarzombek
- Jens Koeppen
- Thomas Heilmann
- Jörg Müller-Lietzkow, holder of the Chair of Media Economics and Media Management at the University of Paderborn and spokesperson for the CDU-affiliated internet policy association Cnetz

===== CSU =====
- Hansjörg Durz
- Reinhard Brandl
- Hans-Peter Friedrich, former Federal Minister of the Interior

===== SPD =====
- Heike Raab (Co-Chair), State Secretary for Federal and European Affairs Rhineland-Palatinate
- Björn Böhning
- Saskia Esken
- Jens Zimmermann
- Martin Rosemann
- Laura Krause and Henning Tillmann for the SPD-affiliated digital policy association D64 – Zentrum für Digitalen Fortschritt

=== Health and Care ===
Chief negotiators: Armin Laschet (CDU), Georg Nüßlein (CSU), Barbara Hendricks (SPD)

==== Other members ====
===== CDU =====
- Hermann Gröhe
- Stefan Grüttner
- Karin Maag
- Rudolf Henke
- Dietrich Monstadt
- Erwin Rüddel

===== CSU =====
- Melanie Huml
- Barbara Stamm
- Emmi Zeulner
- Erich Irlstorfer

===== SPD =====
- Karl Lauterbach (Co-Chair), MdB
- Cornelia Prüfer-Storcks
- Carola Reimann
- Boris Velter
- Stefanie Drese

=== Finance and Taxes ===
Chief negotiators: Peter Altmaier (CDU), Andreas Scheuer (CSU), Olaf Scholz (SPD)

==== Other members ====
===== CDU =====
- Ralph Brinkhaus
- Eckhardt Rehberg
- Antje Tillmann
- Thomas Schäfer
- Christian von Stetten

===== CSU =====
- Hans Michelbach
- Alois Karl
- Alexander Radwan

===== SPD =====
- Christine Lambrecht (Co-Chair), MdB
- Mathias Brodkorb
- Lothar Binding
- Johannes Kahrs
- Doris Ahnen

=== Interior, Law and Consumer Protection ===
Chief negotiators: Thomas de Maizière (CDU), Stephan Mayer (CSU), Heiko Maas (SPD)

==== Other members ====
===== CDU =====
- Stephan Harbarth
- Günter Krings
- Elisabeth Winkelmeier-Becker
- Lorenz Caffier
- Peter Beuth
- Mechthild Heil

===== CSU =====
- Joachim Herrmann
- Winfried Bausback
- Andrea Lindholz

===== SPD =====
- Boris Pistorius (Co-Chair), Minister for Interior and Sports of Lower Saxony
- Eva Högl
- Burkhard Lischka
- Sarah Ryglewski
- Ulrich Kelber
- Johannes Fechner

=== Migration, Integration ===
Chief negotiators: Volker Bouffier (CDU), Joachim Herrmann (CSU), Ralf Stegner (SPD)

==== Other members ====
===== CDU =====
- Thomas de Maizière
- Armin Schuster
- Herbert Reul
- Klaus Bouillon
- Serap Güler

===== CSU =====
- Andreas Scheuer
- Thomas Kreuzer
- Michael Frieser

===== SPD =====
- Eva Högl (Co-Chair), Member of the Bundestag, and Deputy Chair of the SPD Parliamentary Group
- Aydan Özoguz
- Karamba Diaby
- Rüdiger Veit
- Susi Möbbeck
- Petra Köpping

=== Housing construction, rents, urban development ===
Chief negotiators: Bernd Althusmann (CDU), Kurt Gribl (CSU), Natascha Kohnen (SPD)

==== CDU ====
- Jan-Marco Luczak, MdB
- Michael Meister
- Volkmar Vogel
- Hendrik Hoppenstedt
- Ina Scharrenbach

==== CSU ====
- Daniela Ludwig
- Anja Weisgerber
- Alexander Hoffmann

==== SPD ====
- Michael Müller (Co-Chairman), Governing Mayor of Berlin and Chairman of the SPD Berlin
- Dorothee Stapelfeldt
- Michael Groß / Klaus Mindrup
- Ulrich Maly
- Florian Pronold
- Frank Baranowski

=== Municipalities, rural areas ===
Chief negotiators: Reiner Haseloff (CDU), Kurt Gribl (CSU), Michael Groschek (SPD)

==== Other members ====
===== CDU =====
- Michael Grosse-Brömer
- Christian Haase
- Heike Brehmer
- Gitta Connemann
- Vincent Kokert

===== CSU =====
- Alois Rainer
- Florian Oßner
- Marlene Mortler

===== SPD =====
- Leni Breymaier (Co-Chair), Member of the Bundestag and Chairwoman of the SPD Baden-Württemberg
- Bernhard Daldrup
- Frank Baranowski
- Bettina Wilhelm
- Michael Ebling
- Patrick Dahlemann

=== Agriculture ===
Chief negotiators: Julia Klöckner (CDU), Christian Schmidt (CSU), Anke Rehlinger (SPD)

==== Other members ====
===== CDU =====
- Alois Gerig
- Maria Flachsbarth
- Christina Schulze-Föcking
- Peter Bleser
- Peter Jahr

===== CSU =====
- Helmut Brunner
- Marlene Mortler
- Artur Auernhammer

===== SPD =====
- Rita Hagl-Kehl (Co-Chair), MdB
- Rainer Spiering
- Till Backhaus
- Alexander Schweitzer

=== Energy, climate protection, environment ===
Chief negotiators: Armin Laschet (CDU), Georg Nüßlein (CSU), Barbara Hendricks (SPD)

==== Other members ====
===== CDU =====
- Daniel Günther
- Thomas Bareiß
- Andreas Jung
- Marie-Luise Dött
- Peter Liese
- Ingo Senftleben

===== CSU =====
- Ilse Aigner
- Thomas Kreuzer
- Anja Weisgerber

===== SPD =====
- Matthias Miersch (Co-Chair), Member of the Bundestag and member of the SPD party executive committee
- Dietmar Nietan
- Bernd Westphal and Carsten Träger
- Albrecht Gerber and Olaf Lies
- Rita Schwarzelühr-Sutter
- Christian Pegel

=== Foreign Affairs, Development, Defense and Human Rights ===
Chief negotiators: Ursula von der Leyen (CDU), Gerd Müller (CSU), Sigmar Gabriel (SPD)

==== Chief negotiators ====
===== CDU =====
- Jürgen Hardt
- Johann Wadephul
- Henning Otte
- Norbert Röttgen
- Hans-Joachim Fuchtel
- Michael Brand

===== CSU =====
- Florian Hahn
- Thomas Silberhorn
- Alexander Radwan

===== SPD =====
- Rolf Mützenich (Co-Chair), MdB
- Bärbel Kofler
- Niels Annen
- Gabi Weber
- Fritz Felgentreu
- Thomas Hitschler
- Michelle Müntefering

=== Arts, culture, creative industries and media ===
Chief negotiators: Monika Grütters (CDU), Dorothee Bär (CSU), Michael Roth (SPD)

==== Other members ====
===== CDU =====
- Michael Grosse-Brömer
- Marco Wanderwitz
- Eckhard Pols
- Oliver Schenk
- Elisabeth Motschmann

===== CSU =====
- Michael Frieser
- Marcel Huber
- Markus Blume

===== SPD =====
- Carsten Brosda (Co-Chair), Senator of the Hamburg Authority for Culture and Media
- Michelle Müntefering
- Martin Rabanus
- Tim Renner
- Babette Winter

=== Working methods of the government and parliamentary groups ===
Chief negotiators:

- CDU - Volker Kauder, Michael Grosse-Brömer
- CSU - Horst Seehofer, Alexander Dobrindt
- SPD - Andrea Nahles, Carsten Schneider
