= List of mayors of Augsburg =

This is a list of holders of the office of mayor of the German city of Augsburg. For simplicity they are all called mayors, although the title varied over the centuries.

On the head of the city Augsburg as chairman of the town council governed since 1266 the so-called Stadtpfleger, sometimes also called mayor, so it happened that both titles were in use at the same time.

By 1548 the title was fixed as Stadtpfleger. These officiated for some years and after that they were elected for lifetime. This is why there were sometimes two or more Stadtpfleger simultaneously.

After the transfer to Bavaria in 1806 Augsburg constituted a magistracy with two mayors. It was supported by an additional council of so-called "community commissioners" (Gemeindebevollmächtige).

Since 1907 the mayor has been called Oberbürgermeister, because Augsburg reached a population of 100,000. The title is stated in the Bavarian Gemeindeordnung.

Until 1919 mostly mayors were members of the aristocracy. After the last German Kaiser Wilhelm II was deposed, and the implementation of democracy, the officeholder was elected. From this time on, the mayor normally was a member of a political party.

== 19th century ==
Name	DoB/ DoD	Years in office
Albrecht von Stetten	1736–1817	1806
Johann Baptist Peter von Carl	1761–1847	1806
Johann Jakob Besserer von Thalfingen	1753–1834	1807–1813
Johann Christoph von Zabuesnig	1747–1827	1813–1818
Johann Nepomuk von Caspar	1774–1859	1818–1821
Anton Barth	1787–1848	1822–1834
Richard Anton Nikolaus Carron du Val	1793–1846	1834–1846
Georg von Forndran	1807–1866	1847–1866
Ludwig von Fischer	1832–1900	1866–1900

== 20th century ==
Name	DoB/ DoD	Party	Years in office	Notes
Georg von Wolfram	1851–1923		1900–1919	
Kaspar Deutschenbaur	1864–1950	BVP	1919–1929	
Otto Bohl	1885–1969	BVP	1930–1933	
Edmund Stoeckle	1899–1986	NSDAP	1933–1934	
Josef Mayr	1900–1957	NSDAP	1934–1945	
Wilhelm Ott	1886–1969	BVP	1945	provisional mayor
Ludwig Dreifuß	1883–1960		1945–1946	provisional mayor
Otto Weinkamm	1902–1968	CSU	1946	
Heinz Hohner	1907–1967	CSU	1946–1947	
Nikolaus Müller	1892–1980	CSU	1947–1964	
Wolfgang Pepper	1910–1997	SPD	1964–1972	
Hans Breuer	1930–2021	SPD	1972–1990	
Peter Menacher	*1939	CSU	1990–2002	

== 21st century ==
Name	Dob/ DoD	Party	Years in office	Notes
Paul Wengert	*1952	SPD	2002–2008	
Kurt Gribl	*1964	CSU	2008–2020	ran for CSU; entered party after winning the election
Eva Weber	*1977	CSU	2020–2026	first female mayor
Florian Freund	*1979	SPD	2026–present	

== See also ==
- Timeline of Augsburg
