= Max Amling =

German politician (SPD) (1934–2017)

Member of the Bundestag; from Bavaria
- In office 13 December 1972 – 20 December 1990
- Preceded by: Anton Ott
- Succeeded by: Multi-member district
- Constituency: Augsburg (1972–1976); State list (1976–1990)

Personal details
- Born: 28 April 1934 Eibelstadt, Germany
- Died: 7 April 2017 (aged 82) Friedberg, Germany
- Party: Social Democratic
- Children: 5

Max Amling (28 April 1934 – 7 April 2017) was a German politician of the SPD who was a member of the Bundestag for 18 years, from 1972 to 1990.

== Biography ==
After graduating from a Volksschule and an apprenticeship as a plumber from 1948 to 1952, Amling joined the SPD and its youth organization Jusos (meaning Young Socialists) in 1952. He was the secretary of the Augsburg local Jusos chapter from 1962 to 1969 and sat in the city council from 1966 to 1972. In his last year of working in the city council, he was deputy chairman of the SPD City Council Group from June until he was first elected into the Bundestag in November 1972 (the seventh Bundestag) by winning the Augsburg constitutency. He became member of the next Bundestag, the eighth (1976), ninth (1980), tenth (1983) and eleventh (1987), through assignement by his party without having to win any constitutency. He was active in Augsburg's chapter of the German Trade Union Confederation and served as its secretary from 1970 to 1981 and previously as its youth secretary from 1960 to 1968.

After he died in 2017, other politicians expressed their condolences and thanked him for his work. Ulrike Bahr called him a "great personality and an upright Social Democrat".

He had five children.

== Awards and honors ==
- 1972: Augsburg's Silvern Ring of Honour
- 1984: Bavarian Order of Merit (Bayerischer Verdienstorden)
- 1986: German Order of Merit (Bundesverdienstkreuz), 1. Class

== Literature ==
- Rudolf Vierhaus, Ludolf Herbst (Hrsg.), Bruno Jahn (Mitarb.): Biographisches Handbuch der Mitglieder des Deutschen Bundestages. 1949–2002. Bd. 1: A–M. K. G. Saur, München 2002, ISBN 3-598-23782-0, S. 14.
