= Volker Ullrich (politician) =

German politician

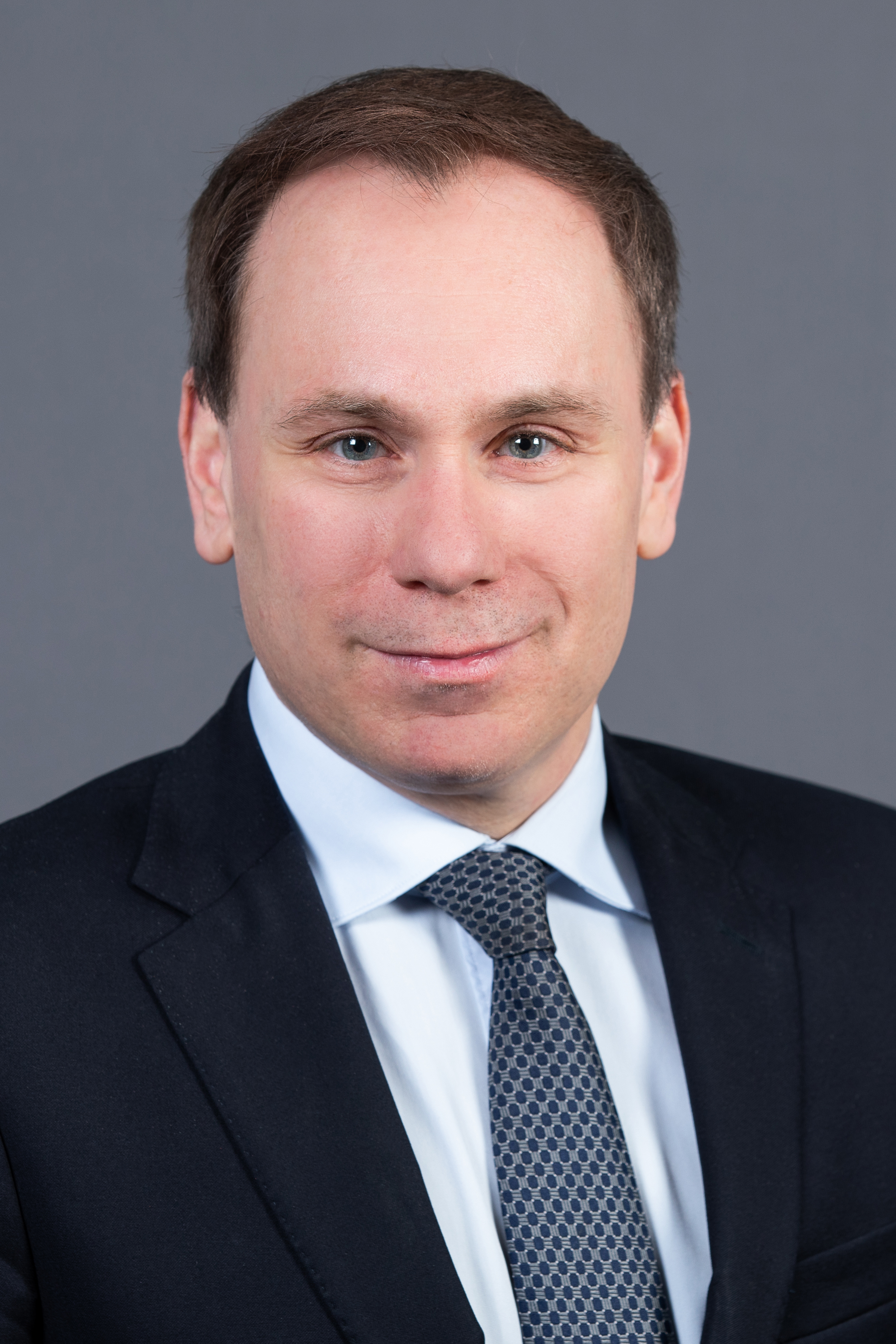
- Ullrich in 2020

Member of the Bundestag; for Augsburg-Stadt
- In office 22 October 2013 – 25 March 2025
- Preceded by: Christian Ruck
- Succeeded by: Seat vacant

Personal details
- Born: 14 October 1975 (age 51) Illertissen, West Germany
- Party: Christian Social Union
- Education: University of Augsburg; University of Hagen

Volker Ullrich (born 14 October 1975) is a German politician of the Christian Social Union (CSU) who has been serving as vice president of the Federal Agency for Civic Education (BPB) since 2026. He previously was a member of the Bundestag from the state of Bavaria from 2013 until 2025.

== Political career ==
Ullrich first became a member of the Bundestag after the 2013 German federal election, elected in Augsburg City. In parliament, he has been a member of the Committee on Legal Affairs (since 2013) and the Committee on European Affairs (2018–2021). In this capacity, he serves as his parliamentary group's rapporteur on the fundamental rights in the German Constitution. Since the 2021 elections, Ullrich has been serving as his parliamentary group's spokesperson for consumer protection.

In addition to his committee assignments, Ullrich is a member of the German Parliamentary Friendship Group with Portugal and Spain. Since 2014, he has been a member of the German delegation to the Parliamentary Assembly of the Council of Europe (PACE). In the Assembly, he has been chairing the Committee on the Election of Judges to the European Court of Human Rights since 2019. He is also a member of the Committee on Legal Affairs and Human Rights.

In the negotiations to form a Grand Coalition under the leadership of Friedrich Merz's Christian Democrats together with the Bavarian CSU and the Social Democrats (SPD) following the 2025 German elections, Ullrich led the CSU delegation in the working group on cultural and media affairs; his counterparts from the other parties were Christiane Schenderlein and Carsten Brosda.

== Other activities ==
- Stiftung Forum Recht, Member of the Board of Trustees (since 2022)
- German Foundation for Consumer Protection (DSV), Member of the Board of Trustees (since 2022)
- Augsburg University of Applied Sciences, Member of the Board of Trustees
