= Senate Scholz II =

State government of Hamburg city-state in Germany from 2015 to 2018

Second Senate of Olaf Scholz Senate Scholz II
- 15 April 2015 – 28 March 2018
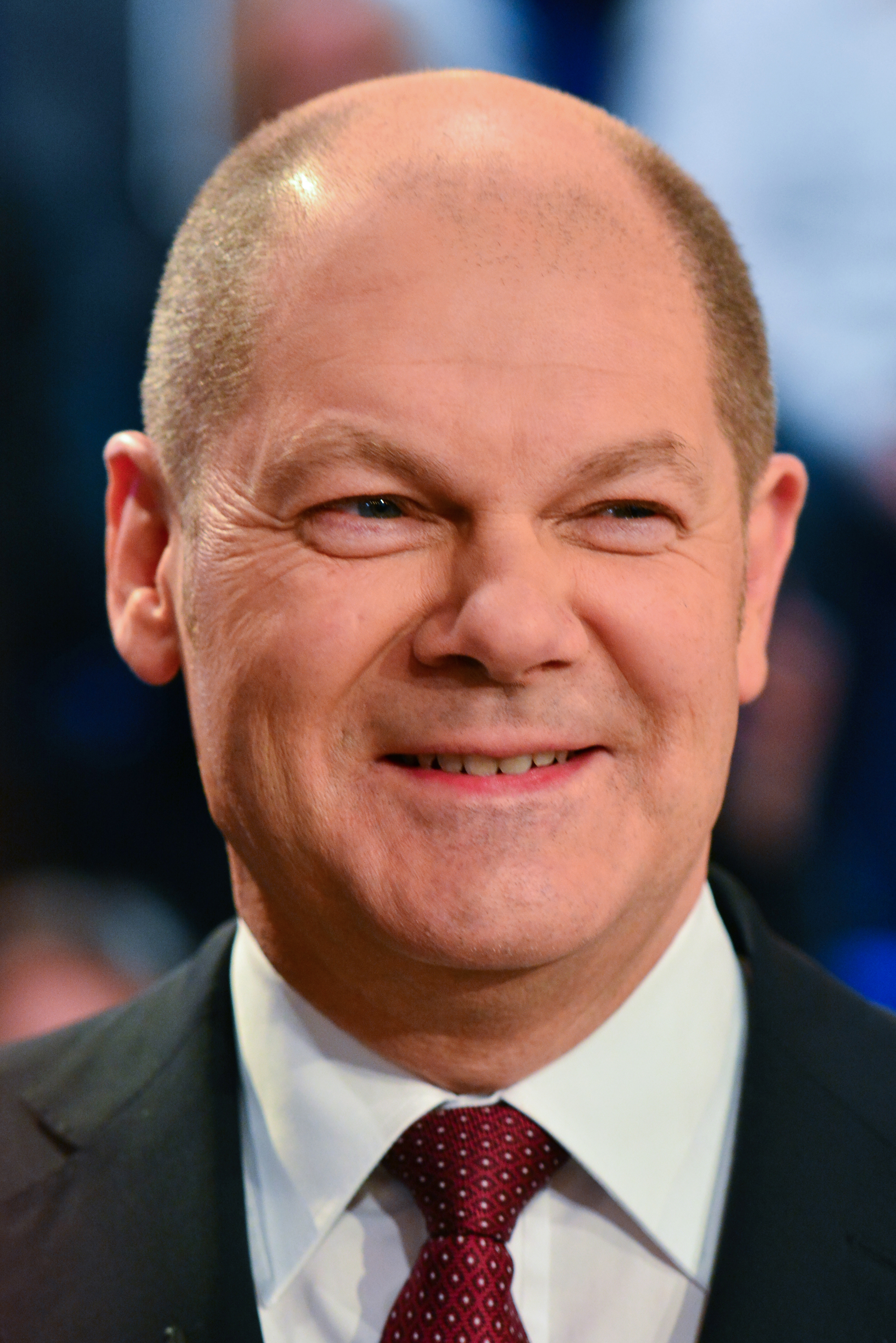
- Olaf Scholz
- Date formed: 15 April 2015
- Date dissolved: 28 March 2018 (2 years, 11 months, 1 week and 6 days)

People and organisations
- Chancellor: Angela Merkel
- First Mayor: Olaf Scholz (until 13 March 2018); Katharina Fegebank (Acting; from 13 March 2018)
- Second Mayor: Katharina Fegebank
- Member party: Social Democratic Party; Alliance 90/The Greens
- Status in legislature: Majority (Coalition)
- Opposition party: Christian Democratic Union; Free Democratic Party; The Left; Alternative for Germany
- Opposition leader: Christian Democratic Union

History
- Election: 2015 Hamburg state election
- Legislature term: 21st Hamburg Parliament
- Predecessor: Senate Scholz I
- Successor: Senate Tschentscher I

The Senate Scholz II (Senat Scholz II) was the government of the German city-state of Hamburg from 15 April 2015 to 28 March 2018 following Senate Scholz I. The Cabinet was, for the second time, headed by First Mayor Olaf Scholz and was formed by the Social Democratic Party, who lost their overall majority in the last state-elections, along with Alliance 90/The Greens. On 15 April 2015 Scholz was elected and sworn in as Mayor by the state assembly. Afterwards he appointed the Senators and had them confirmed by the assembly.

Cabinet members hold the office of Senators and heads of their respective agency, except denoted otherwise.

Katharina Fegebank became acting head of the government on 13 March 2018, after Olaf Scholz retired. Scholz was succeeded by Peter Tschentscher on 28 March 2018, who formed the new state government.

== The Senate ==
Cabinet members
Portfolio	Minister	Took office	Left office	Party
First mayor and president of the senate	Olaf Scholz	15 April 2015	13 March 2018	SPD
First mayor and president of the senate	Katharina Fegebank (Acting)	13 March 2018	28 March 2018	Greens
Second mayor and Senator for Science, Research, and Equal Right	Katharina Fegebank	15 April 2015	28 March 2018	Greens
Senator for Justice and Equal Rights	Till Steffen	15 April 2015	28 March 2018	Greens
Senator for Schools and Professional Skills	Ties Rabe	15 April 2015	28 March 2018	SPD
Senator for Culture	Barbara Kisseler	15 April 2015	7 October 2016 †	Independent
Senator for Culture	Carsten Brosda	1 February 2017	28 March 2018	SPD
Senator for Labor, Social Affairs, Families and Integration	Detlef Scheele	15 April 2015	30 September 2015	SPD
Senator for Labor, Social Affairs, Families and Integration	Melanie Leonhard	1 October 2015	28 March 2018	SPD
Senator for Health and Consumer Protection	Cornelia Prüfer-Storcks	15 April 2015	28 March 2018	SPD
Senator for Urban Development and Residing	Dorothee Stapelfeldt	15 April 2015	28 March 2018	SPD
Senator for Environment and Energy	Jens Kerstan	15 April 2015	28 March 2018	Greens
Senator for Economics, Transport and Innovation	Frank Horch	15 April 2015	28 March 2018	Independent
Senator for Interior and Sports	Michael Neumann	15 April 2015	18 January 2016	SPD
Senator for Interior and Sports	Andy Grote	20 January 2016	28 March 2018	SPD
Senator for Finance	Peter Tschentscher	15 April 2015	28 March 2018	SPD
