= Heinz Hohner =

German politician

Mayor of Augsburg
- In office 1946–1947
- Preceded by: Otto Weinkamm
- Succeeded by: Nikolaus Müller

Personal details
- Born: January 19, 1907; Fürth, Imperial Germany
- Died: May 17, 1967 (aged 60); Frankfurt, Germany
- Political party: Christian Social Union of Bavaria

Heinz Hohner (19 January 1907 – 17 May 1967) was the mayor of Augsburg from 1946 to 1947. He was a member of the Christian Social Union of Bavaria. His father was a prosecutor. He studied legal science in Munich, Kiel, Berlin, Freiburg and Würzburg, where he was promoted.
