= Gruben =

Gruben has different meanings:

== Places ==
- Gruben/Meiden, a village in the canton of Valais, Switzerland
- Gruben, a village in the municipality of Rana in Nordland county, Norway

== People ==
- Federico Grüben, an Argentine Olympic shooter
- Franz Josef von Gruben (1829–1888), a German politician
- Patricia Gruben, an American-born filmmaker
- Thierry de Gruben, a former Ambassador from the Kingdom of Belgium to the United Kingdom

== See also ==
- Tuktoyaktuk/James Gruben Airport, an airport in northern Canada
