= Senate Scholz I =

State government of Hamburg city-state in Germany from 2011 to 2015

First Senate of Olaf Scholz Senate Scholz I
- 7 March 2011 – 15 April 2015
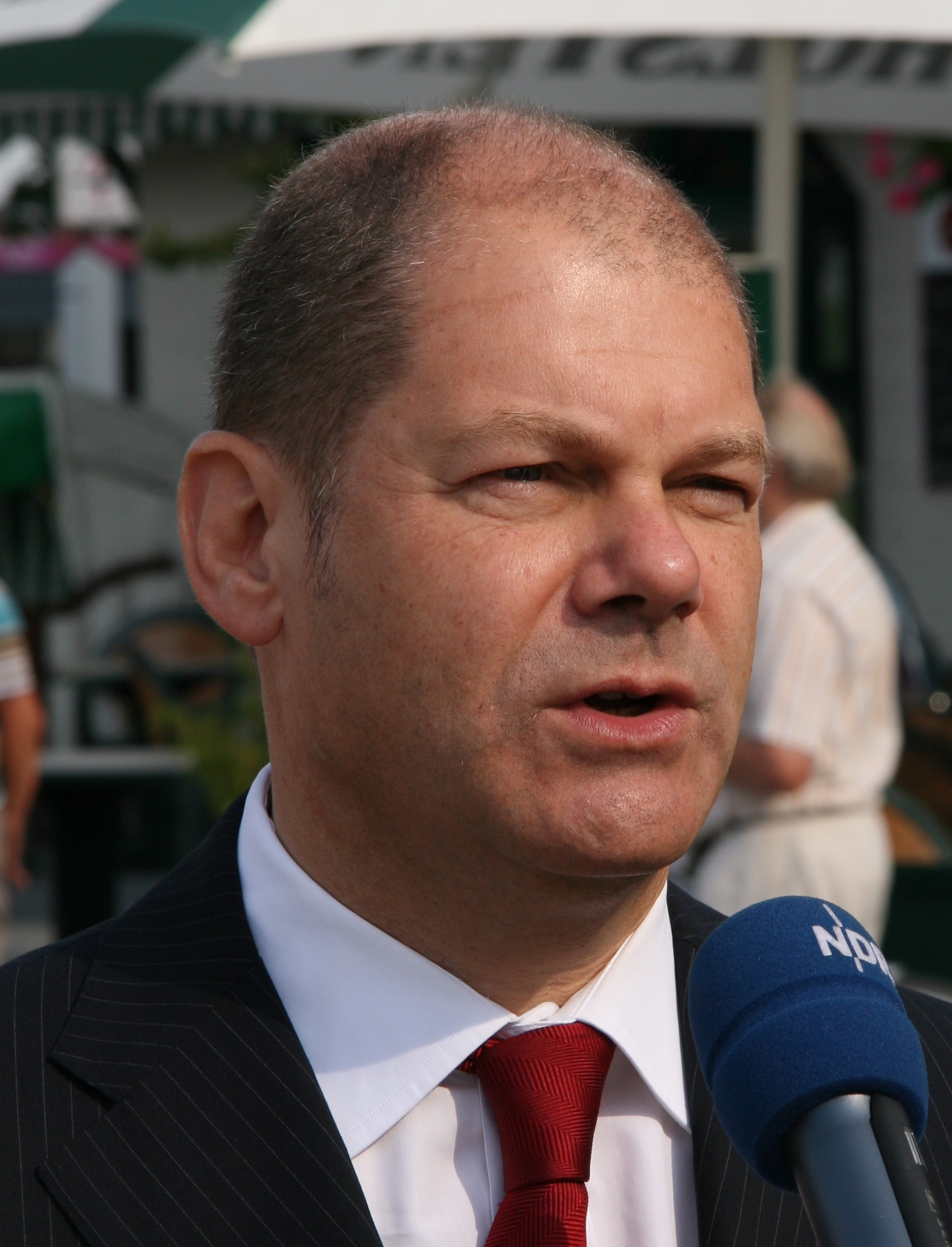
- Olaf Scholz
- Date formed: 7 March 2011
- Date dissolved: 15 April 2015 (4 years, 1 month, 1 week and 1 day)

People and organisations
- Chancellor: Angela Merkel
- First Mayor: Olaf Scholz
- Second Mayor: Dorothee Stapelfeldt
- Member party: Social Democratic Party
- Status in legislature: Majority
- Opposition party: Christian Democratic Union; Alliance 90/The Greens; Free Democratic Party; The Left
- Opposition leader: Christian Democratic Union

History
- Election: 2011 Hamburg state election
- Legislature term: 20th Hamburg Parliament
- Predecessor: Senate Althaus
- Successor: Senate Scholz II

The Senate Scholz I (German: Senat Scholz I) was the government of the German city-state of Hamburg from 7 March 2011 to 15 April 2015. The Cabinet was headed by First Mayor Olaf Scholz and was formed by the Social Democratic Party, who gained an overall majority in the last state-elections. On 7 March 2011 Scholz was elected and sworn in as Mayor by the state assembly. On 23 March 2011 he appointed the Senators and had them confirmed by the assembly.

Cabinet members hold the office of Senators and heads of their respective agency, except denoted otherwise.

== The Senate ==
Cabinet members
Portfolio	Minister	Took office	Left office	Party
First Mayor and President of the Senate	Olaf Scholz	7 March 2011	15 April 2015	SPD
Second Mayor & Senator for Science and Research	Dorothee Stapelfeldt	7 March 2011	15 April 2015	SPD
Senator for Justice and Equal Rights	Jana Schiedek	7 March 2011	15 April 2015	SPD
Senator for Schools and Professional Skills	Ties Rabe	7 March 2011	15 April 2015	SPD
Senator for Culture	Barbara Kisseler	7 March 2011	15 April 2015	Independent
Senator for Labor, Social Affairs, Families and Integration	Detlef Scheele	7 March 2011	15 April 2015	SPD
Senator for Health and Consumer Protection	Cornelia Prüfer-Storcks	7 March 2011	15 April 2015	SPD
Senator for Urban Development and Environment	Jutta Blankau	7 March 2011	15 April 2015	SPD
Senator for Economics, Transport and Innovation	Frank Horch	7 March 2011	15 April 2015	Independent
Senator for Interior and Sports	Michael Neumann	7 March 2011	15 April 2015	SPD
Senator for Finance	Peter Tschentscher	7 March 2011	15 April 2015	SPD
