= Augsburg-Stadt (electoral district) =

Federal electoral district of Germany

251 Augsburg-Stadt
- Electoral district for the Bundestag
- Augsburg-Stadt in 2025
- State: Bavaria
- Population: 324,600 (2019)
- Electorate: 186,447 (2025)
- Major settlements: Augsburg
- Area: 146.8 km^{2}

Current electoral district
- Created: 1949
- Party: None
- Member: Vacant
- Elected: 2025

Augsburg-Stadt (English: Augsburg City) is an electoral constituency (German: Wahlkreis) represented in the Bundestag. It elects one member via first-past-the-post voting. Under the current constituency numbering system, it is designated as constituency 251. It is located in southwestern Bavaria, comprising the city of Augsburg.

Augsburg-Stadt was created for the inaugural 1949 federal election. Whilst the Christian Social Union won the plurality in the 2025 election, under the new voting system, their candidate did not actually win a seat in the Bundestag. This was due to the distribution of seats won by the CSU being decided by the first (direct) vote percentage of each winning CSU candidate, determining who took the seats. As the CSU candidate got a low vote of 31.1%, the seat will remain vacant throughout the 21st Bundestag.

== Geography ==
Augsburg-Stadt is located in southwestern Bavaria. As of the 2025 federal election, it comprises the independent city of Augsburg-Stadt.

== History ==
Augsburg-Stadt was created in 1949. In the 1965 through 1972 elections, it was named Augsburg. In the 1949 election, it was Bavaria constituency 41 in the numbering system. In the 1953 through 1961 elections, it was number 236. In the 1965 through 1998 elections, it was number 238. In the 2002 and 2005 elections, it was number 253. In the 2009 through 2021 elections, it was number 252. From the 2025 election, it has been number 251.

Originally, the constituency was coterminous with the independent city of Augsburg. It gained the municipality of Königsbrunn from the district of Landkreis Augsburg in 1998. From 2025, it has again been coterminous with the city of Augsburg.

Election	No.	Name	Borders
1949	41	Augsburg-Stadt	Augsburg city
1953	236	Augsburg-Stadt	Augsburg city
1957	236	Augsburg-Stadt	Augsburg city
1961	236	Augsburg-Stadt	Augsburg city
1965	238	Augsburg	Augsburg city
1969	238	Augsburg	Augsburg city
1972	238	Augsburg	Augsburg city
1976	238	Augsburg-Stadt	Augsburg city
1980	238	Augsburg-Stadt	Augsburg city
1983	238	Augsburg-Stadt	Augsburg city
1987	238	Augsburg-Stadt	Augsburg city
1990	238	Augsburg-Stadt	Augsburg city
1994	238	Augsburg-Stadt	Augsburg city
1998	238	Augsburg-Stadt	Augsburg city; Landkreis Augsburg district (only Königsbrunn municipality)
2002	253	Augsburg-Stadt	Augsburg city; Landkreis Augsburg district (only Königsbrunn municipality)
2005	253	Augsburg-Stadt	Augsburg city; Landkreis Augsburg district (only Königsbrunn municipality)
2009	252	Augsburg-Stadt	Augsburg city; Landkreis Augsburg district (only Königsbrunn municipality)
2013	252	Augsburg-Stadt	Augsburg city; Landkreis Augsburg district (only Königsbrunn municipality)
2017	252	Augsburg-Stadt	Augsburg city; Landkreis Augsburg district (only Königsbrunn municipality)
2021	252	Augsburg-Stadt	Augsburg city; Landkreis Augsburg district (only Königsbrunn municipality)
2025	251	Augsburg-Stadt	Augsburg city

== Members ==
The constituency has been held by the Christian Social Union (CSU) during all but one Bundestag term since its creation. It was first represented by Josef Ferdinand Kleindinst from 1949 to 1957, followed by Otto Weinkamm from 1957 to 1965. Anton Ott was representative from 1965 to 1972. Max Amling of the Social Democratic Party (SPD) was elected in 1972 and served one term. Stefan Höpfinger regained the constituency for the CSU in 1976, and served until 1990. Christian Ruck was then representative from 1990 to 2013. Volker Ullrich was elected in 2013, and re-elected in 2017 and 2021. The seat became vacant as a result of the 2025 election.

Election	Member	Party	%
1949	Josef Ferdinand Kleindinst	CSU	29.0
1953	Josef Ferdinand Kleindinst	CSU	54.3
1957	Otto Weinkamm	CSU	53.4
1961	Otto Weinkamm	CSU	44.0
1965	Anton Ott	CSU	46.3
1969	Anton Ott	CSU	47.6
1972	Max Amling	SPD	48.6
1976	Stefan Höpfinger	CSU	51.0
1980	Stefan Höpfinger	CSU	50.6
1983	Stefan Höpfinger	CSU	55.6
1987	Stefan Höpfinger	CSU	53.1
1990	Christian Ruck	CSU	47.6
1994	Christian Ruck	CSU	49.5
1998	Christian Ruck	CSU	47.2
2002	Christian Ruck	CSU	53.6
2005	Christian Ruck	CSU	49.2
2009	Christian Ruck	CSU	42.2
2013	Volker Ullrich	CSU	44.4
2017	Volker Ullrich	CSU	34.8
2021	Volker Ullrich	CSU	28.1
2025	Vacant (Note: Volker Ullrich (CSU) won with 31.1% but seat remained vacant due to insufficient second votes cover.)		

== Election results ==
=== 2025 election ===
Under the new voting system implemented for the 2025 election, although the CSU candidate won the most votes in this constituency, due to the low winning percentage, the constituency seat will remain vacant as not enough second (party) votes were won to be allocated this seat.

Federal election (2025): Augsburg-Stadt
Notes:	Blue background denotes the winner of the electorate vote. Pink background denotes a candidate elected from their party list. Yellow background denotes an electorate win by a list member, or other incumbent. A ✓ or ✗ denotes status of any incumbent, win or lose respectively.						
Party	Candidate	Votes	%	±%	Party votes	%	±%
CSU	✗ Volker Ullrich	45,744	31.1	▲3.8	41,917	28.4	▲3.7
Greens	Claudia Benedikta Roth	30,321	20.6	▼0.9	24,311	16.5	▼3.4
AfD	Raimond Christian Scheirich	25,488	17.3	▲8.7	25,826	17.5	▲8.6
SPD	Ulrike Bahr	20,701	14.1	▼4.1	19,791	13.4	▼5.8
Left	Elisabeth Pauline Santoschama Wiesholler	10,969	7.4	▲2.5	15,568	10.6	▲5.8
BSW					5,831	4.0	
FW	Michael Wörle	5,462	3.7	▼0.3	3,359	2.3	▼1.6
FDP	Maximilian Funke-Kaiser	4,138	2.8	▼5.7	6,076	4.1	▼7.0
APT					1,189	0.8	▼0.2
Volt	Fabian Georg Kahn	1,726	1.2	▲0.7	1,011	0.7	▲0.3
PARTEI					931	0.6	▼0.5
dieBasis	Peter Werner Knörzer	1,433	1.0	▼1.2	679	0.5	▼1.6
ÖDP	Maria Hedwig Brandenstein	1,078	0.7	▼0.4	557	0.4	▼0.2
BP					162	0.1	▼0.2
Humanists					139	0.1	Steady
BD					119	0.1	
MLPD	Emil Karl Eckehard Bauer	243	0.2	Steady	93	0.1	Steady
Informal votes		803			547		
Total valid votes		147,303			147,559		
Turnout		148,106	79.4	▲5.9			
Vacant gain from CSU	Majority						

=== 2021 election ===
Federal election (2021): Augsburg-Stadt
Notes:	Blue background denotes the winner of the electorate vote. Pink background denotes a candidate elected from their party list. Yellow background denotes an electorate win by a list member, or other incumbent. A ✓ or ✗ denotes status of any incumbent, win or lose respectively.						
Party	Candidate	Votes	%	±%	Party votes	%	±%
CSU	✓ Volker Ullrich	42,780	28.1	▼6.7	38,653	25.4	▼6.5
Greens	Claudia Roth	31,347	20.6	▲6.7	28,971	19.0	▲6.7
SPD	Ulrike Bahr	27,453	18.0	▼1.3	29,200	19.2	▲3.3
AfD	Raimond Scheirich	13,431	8.8	▼4.5	13,888	9.1	▼4.7
FDP	Alexander Meyer	12,880	8.5	▲2.4	16,969	11.1	▲1.2
Left	Maximilian Hintermayr	7,168	4.7	▼3.8	6,952	4.6	▼4.4
FW	Bernhard Müller	6,540	4.3	▲2.2	6,446	4.2	▲2.7
dieBasis	Klaus Jaeger	3,399	2.2		3,092	2.0	
PARTEI	Roland Kurschat	2,395	1.6		1,683	1.1	0.0
Tierschutzpartei					1,624	1.1	0.0
ÖDP	Alexander Mai	1,637	1.1	▼0.5	936	0.6	▼0.2
Team Todenhöfer					802	0.5	
V-Partei3	Anna Weingart	954	0.6		479	0.3	▼0.1
Volt	Nelly Rüttiger	697	0.5		589	0.4	
Pirates					578	0.4	▼0.2
BP	Anton Steinböck	645	0.4		472	0.3	▼0.2
Independent	Ediz Sirin	577	0.4				
Unabhängige					250	0.2	
Independent	Alexandra Kolb	242	0.2				
Humanists					173	0.1	
Gesundheitsforschung					178	0.1	0.0
Bündnis C					116	0.1	
MLPD	Emil Bauer	166	0.1	▼0.2	98	0.1	0.0
NPD					90	0.1	▼0.2
du.					91	0.1	
The III. Path					62	0.0	
LKR					38	0.0	
DKP					30	0.0	0.0
Informal votes		1,004			855		
Total valid votes		152,311			152,460		
Turnout		153,315	73.9	▲1.1			
CSU hold	Majority	11,433	7.5	▼8.0			

=== 2017 election ===
Federal election (2017): Augsburg-Stadt
Notes:	Blue background denotes the winner of the electorate vote. Pink background denotes a candidate elected from their party list. Yellow background denotes an electorate win by a list member, or other incumbent. A ✓ or ✗ denotes status of any incumbent, win or lose respectively.						
Party	Candidate	Votes	%	±%	Party votes	%	±%
CSU	✓ Volker Ullrich	52,769	34.8	▼9.6	48,420	31.8	▼11.8
SPD	Ulrike Bahr	29,285	19.3	▼5.8	24,112	15.9	▼6.3
Greens	Claudia Roth	21,062	13.9	▲2.9	18,782	12.4	▲1.8
AfD	Markus Bayerbach	20,170	13.3	▲8.5	21,015	13.8	▲8.4
Left	Frederik Hintermayr	12,850	8.5	▲3.6	13,649	9.0	▲3.4
FDP	Maximilian Funke	9,191	6.1	▲2.6	15,149	10.0	▲5.3
FW	Ruth Abmayr	3,204	2.1	0.0	2,302	1.5	0.0
PARTEI					1,697	1.1	
ÖDP	Robert Huemer	2,375	1.6		1,243	0.8	0.0
Pirates					936	0.6	▼2.0
BP					714	0.5	▼0.1
V-Partei³					615	0.4	
DiB					355	0.2	
DM					335	0.2	
NPD					334	0.2	▼0.4
BGE					319	0.2	
Gesundheitsforschung					218	0.1	
MLPD	Emil Bauer	406	0.3	▲0.1	145	0.1	0.0
BüSo	Hannelore Fackler-Plump	330	0.2	▲0.1	81	0.1	0.0
DKP					41	0.0	
Informal votes		1,586			1,174		
Total valid votes		151,642			152,054		
Turnout		153,228	72.8	▲8.7			
CSU hold	Majority	23,484	15.5	▼3.8			

=== 2013 election ===
Federal election (2013): Augsburg-Stadt
Notes:	Blue background denotes the winner of the electorate vote. Pink background denotes a candidate elected from their party list. Yellow background denotes an electorate win by a list member, or other incumbent. A ✓ or ✗ denotes status of any incumbent, win or lose respectively.						
Party	Candidate	Votes	%	±%	Party votes	%	±%
CSU	Volker Ullrich	58,622	44.4	▲2.2	57,699	43.6	▲5.1
SPD	Ulrike Bahr	33,145	25.1	▲5.5	29,328	22.2	▲3.6
Greens	Claudia Roth	14,568	11.0	▼3.7	13,940	10.5	▼2.1
Left	Alexander Süßmair	6,408	4.9	▼2.1	7,391	5.6	▼2.3
AfD	Thomas Eisinger	6,301	4.8		7,136	5.4	
FDP	Miriam Gruß	4,511	3.4	▼7.5	6,187	4.7	▼8.5
Pirates	Claudius Roggenkamp	3,508	2.7		3,424	2.6	▼0.5
FW	Rose-Marie Kranzfelder-Poth	2,764	2.1		1,976	1.5	
ÖDP					1,034	0.8	0.0
Tierschutzpartei					1,012	0.8	0.0
NPD	Manfred Waldukat	908	0.7	▼0.8	841	0.6	▼0.6
BP					700	0.5	0.0
REP	Helmut Dürrwanger	844	0.6		641	0.5	▼0.2
DIE FRAUEN					258	0.2	
DIE VIOLETTEN					205	0.2	▼0.1
Party of Reason					136	0.1	
PRO					116	0.1	
MLPD	Emil Bauer	162	0.1	0.0	84	0.1	0.0
BüSo	Hannelore Fackler-Plump	142	0.1	0.0	43	0.0	0.0
RRP	Otto Blank	141	0.1	▼1.1	115	0.1	▼1.0
Informal votes		1,354			1,112		
Total valid votes		132,024			132,266		
Turnout		133,378	64.1	▼1.9			
CSU hold	Majority	25,477	19.3	▼3.3			

=== 2009 election ===
Federal election (2009): Augsburg-Stadt
Notes:	Blue background denotes the winner of the electorate vote. Pink background denotes a candidate elected from their party list. Yellow background denotes an electorate win by a list member, or other incumbent. A ✓ or ✗ denotes status of any incumbent, win or lose respectively.						
Party	Candidate	Votes	%	±%	Party votes	%	±%
CSU	✓ Christian Ruck	56,644	42.2	▼7.0	51,728	38.5	▼5.8
SPD	Heinz Paula	26,268	19.6	▼8.5	24,981	18.6	▼9.4
Greens	Claudia Roth	19,708	14.7	▲2.8	16,898	12.6	▲2.1
FDP	Miriam Gruß	14,638	10.9	▲5.9	17,645	13.1	▲4.0
Left	Alexander Süßmair	9,318	6.9	▲3.3	10,552	7.9	▲3.7
Pirates					4,166	3.1	
NPD	Rudolf Rieger	2,038	1.5	0.0	1,602	1.2	▲0.1
RRP	Joachim Preuß	1,658	1.2		1,513	1.1	
ÖDP	Robert Huemer	1,621	1.2		1,073	0.8	
Tierschutzpartei					965	0.7	
REP					899	0.7	▼0.3
BP	Max Walser	1,022	0.8		674	0.5	▲0.2
Independent	Maria-Barbara Mangold-Nietzschmann	846	0.6				
FAMILIE					665	0.5	0.0
DIE VIOLETTEN					307	0.2	
PBC					136	0.1	▼0.1
CM					115	0.1	
MLPD	Emil Bauer	230	0.2		113	0.1	0.0
BüSo	Hannelore Fackler-Plump	177	0.1	▼0.5	89	0.1	▼0.1
DVU					88	0.1	
Informal votes		1,789			1,748		
Total valid votes		134,168			134,209		
Turnout		135,957	65.9	▼7.6			
CSU hold	Majority	30,376	22.6	▲1.5			

=== 2005 election ===
Federal election (2005):Augsburg-Stadt
Notes:	Blue background denotes the winner of the electorate vote. Pink background denotes a candidate elected from their party list. Yellow background denotes an electorate win by a list member, or other incumbent. A ✓ or ✗ denotes status of any incumbent, win or lose respectively.						
Party	Candidate	Votes	%	±%	Party votes	%	±%
CSU	✓ Christian Ruck	72,284	49.2	▼4.4	65,285	44.4	▼8.4
SPD	Heinz Paula	41,290	28.1	▼1.8	41,149	28.0	▼2.8
Greens	Claudia Roth	17,462	11.9	▲1.2	15,457	10.5	▲1.6
FDP	Miriam Krebs	7,393	5.0	▲1.2	13,427	9.1	▲4.9
Left	Peter Knappe	5,280	3.6	▲2.7	6,052	4.1	▲3.3
NPD	Rico Döhler	2,257	1.5		1,617	1.1	▲0.9
REP					1,437	1.0	▲0.3
BüSo	Hannelore Fackler-Plump	877	0.6		250	0.2	▲0.2
Familie					682	0.5	
GRAUEN					490	0.3	▲0.2
BP					455	0.3	▲0.2
Feminist					358	0.2	▲0.1
PBC					353	0.2	▲0.1
MLPD					116	0.1	
Informal votes		2,615			2,330		
Total valid votes		146,843			147,128		
Turnout		149,458	73.6	▼3.8			
CSU hold	Majority	30,994	21.1				
