= Wolfgang Pepper =

Mayor of Augsburg from 1964 to 1972

Mayor of Augsburg
- In office 1964–1972
- Preceded by: Nikolaus Müller
- Succeeded by: Hans Breuer

Personal details
- Born: 14 October 1910 Kiel, Imperial Germany
- Died: 12 October 1997 (aged 86) Berlin, Germany
- Party: Social Democratic Party

Wolfgang Pepper (14 October 1910, Kiel – 12 October 1997, Berlin) was a German journalist and politician who served as the mayor of Augsburg from 1964 to 1972. He was a member of the Social Democratic Party.
