= Alois Albert =

German politician

Personal details
- Born: June 21, 1880 Bad Königshofen, Lower Franconia, German Empire
- Died: December 16, 1939 (aged 59) Germany
- Citizenship: German
- Party: Bavarian People's Party
- Occupation: Politician

Alois Albert (21 June 1880 in Bad Königshofen, Lower Franconia – 16 December 1939) was a German politician, representative of the Bavarian People's Party.

== See also ==
- List of Bavarian People's Party politicians
