= Hans Adlhoch =

German politician (1883–1945)

Hans Adlhoch (29 January 1883 in Straubing, Lower Bavaria – 21 May 1945 in Munich) was a German politician, representative of the Bavarian People's Party. He was a member of the City Council at Augsburg, and from January–March 1933 was Reichstag deputy. He was imprisoned at Dachau concentration camp on 21 September 1944 in his connection with the 20 July Plot to assassinate Adolf Hitler. He died shortly after the camp's liberation in a Munich hospital, aged 62. He is commemorated in the Memorial to the Murdered Members of the Reichstag at Berlin, Germany.

== See also ==
- List of Bavarian People's Party politicians
