= Detlef Scheele =

German politician

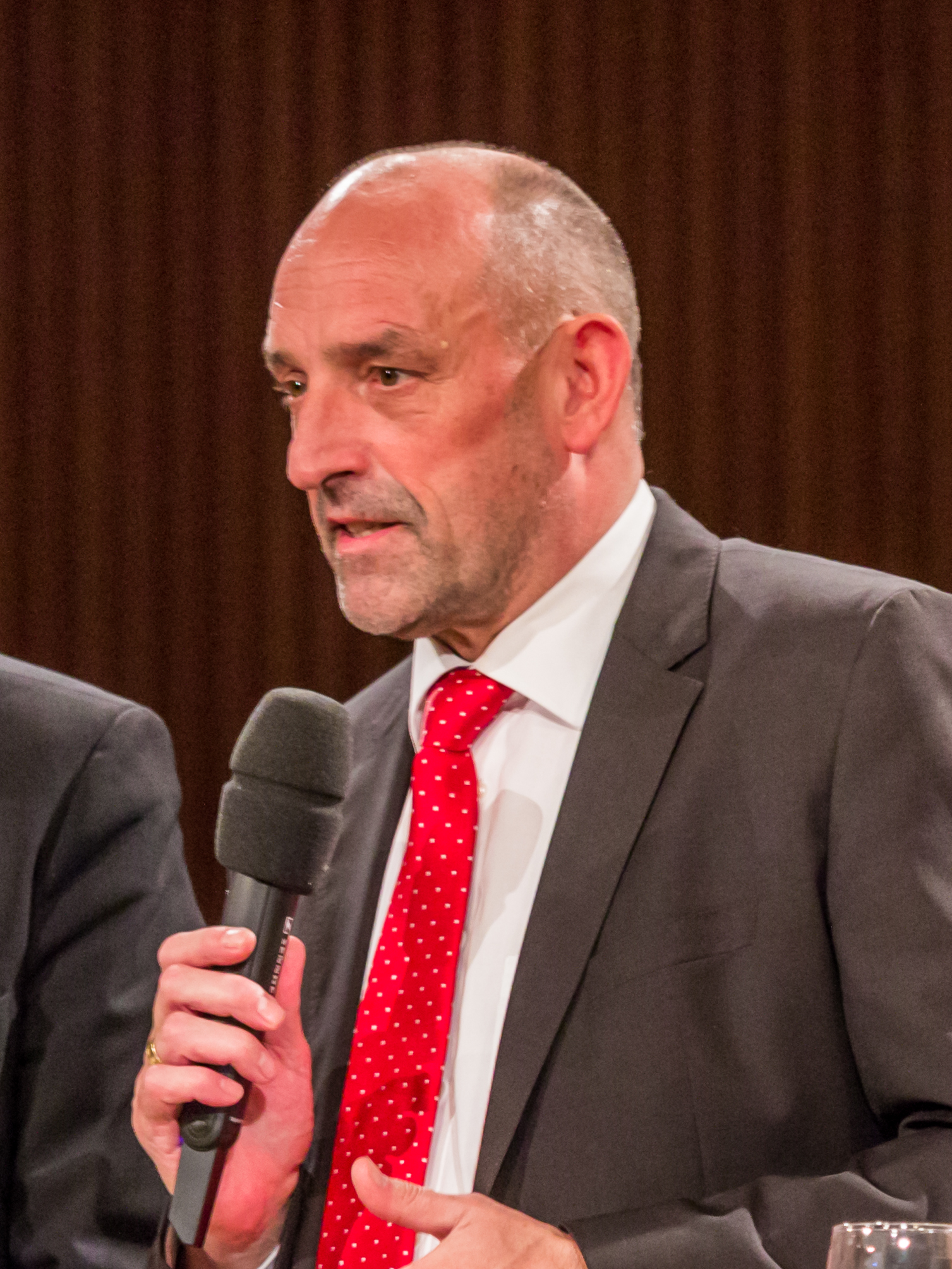
Detlef Scheele at a TV debate, 2016

Detlef Scheele (born 30 September 1956) is a German politician (SPD). On 1 April 2017, he became chairman of the German Federal Employment Agency.

== Early life ==
Scheele was born in Hamburg. After graduating from the Gymnasium Bahrenfeld high school in Hamburg in 1977 and after Zivildienst, Scheele studied political science, sports and education at the University of Hamburg. He graduated in 1984 with the first state examination for teaching at high schools.

== Career ==
From 1985 to 1987 Scheele was a spokesman for former SPD state chairman Ortwin Runde. He then moved to the Center for Vocational Training (Zentrum zur beruflichen Qualifizierung) as deputy managing director and in 1991 became sole director. In 1995, he moved to the Hamburg Municipal Workers' Employment Agency (Hamburger-Arbeit-Beschäftigungsgesellschaft) as the managing director and served there until his appointment as State Secretary in 2008. He was for many years district chairman of the SPD Hamburg North.

From 2 April 2008 to 31 December 2009, Scheele was State Secretary in the Federal Ministry of Labor and Social Affairs serving under the then Federal Minister Olaf Scholz (SPD). After the change of government as a result of the 2009 federal election, he retired from office.

From February 2010 until his appointment to the Senate, Scheele was managing director of the Elbe-Werkstätten and other Hamburg companies offering jobs for people with disabilities.

On March 23, 2011, Scheele was appointed senator and president of the Department of Labor, Social Affairs, Family and Integration by Olaf Scholz, now First Mayor in Hamburg (Senate Scholz I). He was confirmed in his office for the Senate Scholz II. On 3 July 2015, the board of the Federal Employment Agency (Bundesagentur für Arbeit, BA) elected him in an extraordinary meeting as new board member for the labor market of the BA and thus in the three-member board.

On 7 October 2016, the board of the Federal Agency decided to propose Scheele in the office of chairman of the board. On 1 April 2017, he took office.

== Other activities ==
- Baden-Badener Unternehmer-Gespräche (BBUG), member of the board of trustees (since 2021)

== Personal life ==
Scheele is married and has three children.
