= Bad Königshofen =

- Town
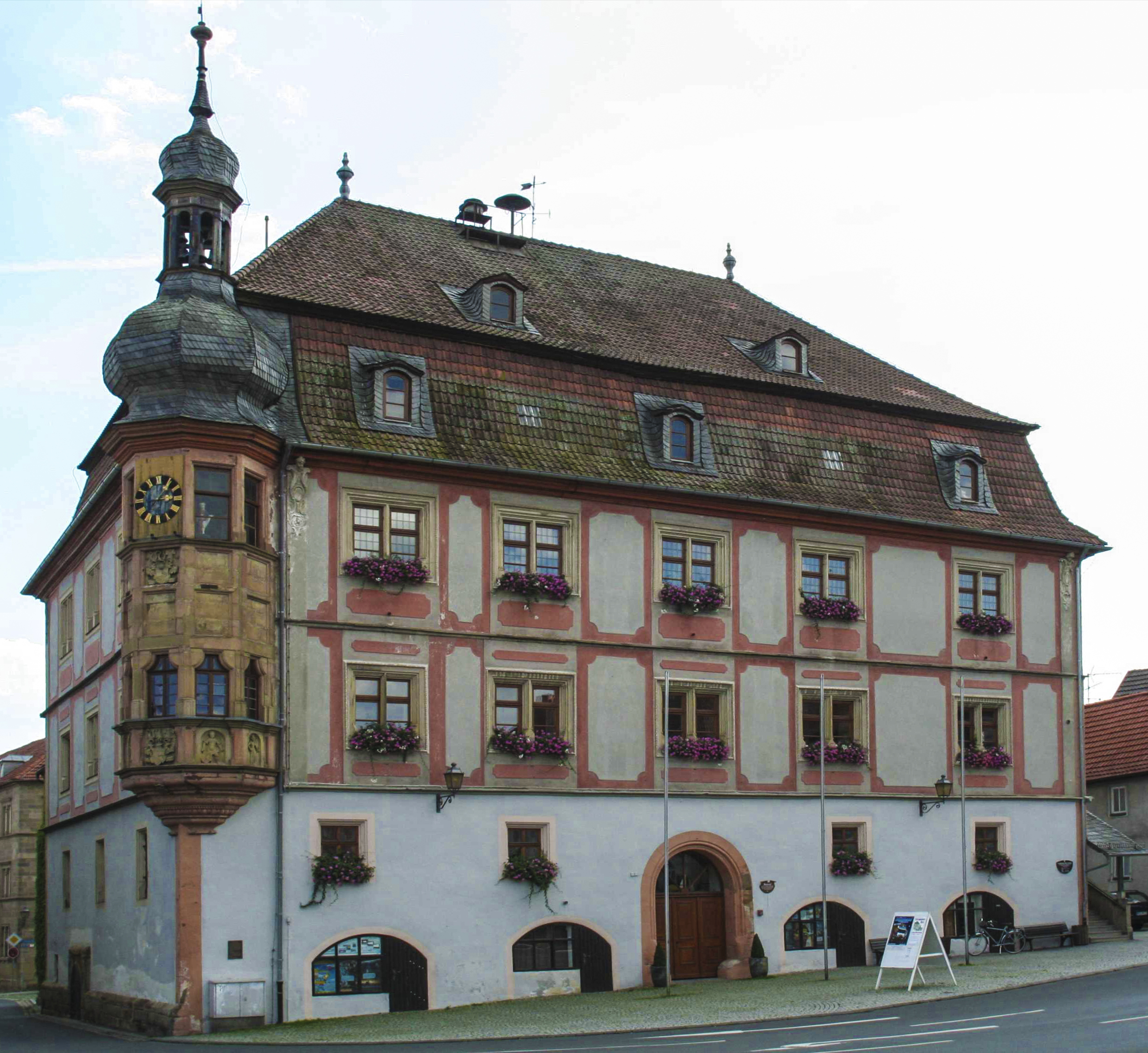
- Town hall

- Coat of arms

- Location of Bad Königshofen within Rhön-Grabfeld district
- Interactive map of Bad Königshofen
- Location within Germany Location within Bavaria
- Coordinates: 50°18′N 10°25′E
- Country: Germany
- State: Bavaria
- Admin. region: Unterfranken
- District: Rhön-Grabfeld

Government
  - Mayor (2020–26): Thomas Helbling (CSU)

Area
  - Total: 69.51 km^{2} (26.84 sq mi)
- Elevation: 276 m (906 ft)

Population (2025-12-31)
  - Total: 5,917
  - Density: 85.12/km^{2} (220.5/sq mi)
- Time zone: UTC+01:00 (CET)
  - Summer (DST): UTC+02:00 (CEST)
- Postal codes: 97631
- Dialling codes: 09761
- Vehicle registration: NES, KÖN, MET
- Website: www.badkoenigshofen.de

Bad Königshofen im Grabfeld (German pronunciation: [baːt køːnɪçsˈhoːfn̩ ʔɪm ˈɡʁaːpˌfɛlt], lit. 'Bad Königshofen in the Grabfeld') is a small spa town in the German state of Bavaria, located in the Rhön-Grabfeld district in northeast Lower Franconia, Bavaria, Germany. According to the Bavarian State Office for Statistics and Data, Bad Königshofen had a population of 5,995 in 2017. The Franconian Saale flows through the town.

== Geography ==
There are 17 town districts:

- Althausen
- Aub
- Aumühle
- Bad Königshofen i.Grabfeld
- Eyershausen
- Gabolshausen
- Göckesmühle
- Haumühle
- Ipthausen
- Lustmühle
- Merkershausen
- Riedmühle
- Sambachshof
- Spitalmühle
- Untereßfeld
- Veitsmühle
- Zänkersmühle (untere Mühle)

It is only 7 kilometres (4.3 mi) from the state of Thuringia.

The city is twinned with Arlington, Texas, USA. Bad Königshofen has a downtown recreational park named "Arlington" in honor of the city of Arlington. In 2006, the City of Arlington opened a water park named "Bad Königshofen Family Aquatic Center" in honor of the city of Bad Königshofen.

== History ==
First mention of the town was in 741, although it had been settled way before then. Graves marked from as early as the 6th century have been found. There are Christian and pagan burials in this Festung Road cemetery. Artifacts found in the graves included a longsword and pottery. An even older cemetery found on Bamberger Road shows evidence of settlement in the 4th century.

During the Middle Ages, the town was ruled by tribal duchies as the Duchy of Franconia. The town was granted a city charter in 1235. Königshofen was owned by the House of Henneberg in 1200. In 1353, the heiress Elisabeth of Henneberg married Eberhard II, Count of Württemberg and he sold the town in 1354 to the bishops of Würzburg. They subsequently expanded the town into a fortress. The House of Henneberg acquired the castle in 1400 and in 1412 they bought the entire town back from the Würzburg monastery. Later, the town became home to an episcopal bailiff. In 1603, there was a Leper colony called the Siechhaus in the town.

Bad Königshofen was the terminus of the 23.2 km Bad Neustadt–Bad Königshofen railway line (de:Bahnstrecke Bad Neustadt–Bad Königshofen) that followed the Franconian Saale River from Bad Neustadt an der Saale. The railway, also known as the Grabfeld Railway (Grabfeldbahn), opened in 1873. Passenger services ended in 1976, freight service ended in 1994, and the track was dismantled in 1997.

On 8 April 1945 the 3rd Battalion of the U.S. 180th Regiment, 45th Infantry Division captured several towns from Volkershausen to Königshofen.

== Demographics ==
Historical populations of Königshofen from 1814 to 1970.

Historical population
Date	Pop.
1814	1,576
1900	1,728
1946	3,122
1960	3,212
1968	3,549
1970	3,237

== Government ==
The elections in March 2014 showed the following results:

- CSU: 5 seats
- SPD: 2 seats
- Greens: 1 seat
- Block Freier Wähler (Free voters): 2 seats
- List Merkershausen: 2 seats
- Bürgerblock der Stadtteile: 2 seats
- List Eyershausen: 2 seats
- List Althausen: 1 seat
- List Untereßfeld: 1 seat
- Junge Liste (young list): 1 seat
- Aktive Bürger Bad Königshofen (Active citizens Bad Königshofen) 1 seat

== Notable people ==
- Gaspar Schott (1608-1666), science writer and educator
- Ludwig Rousseau (1724-1794), German chemist
- Karl Albert (1743-1819), sculptor of the Rococo
- Alois Albert (1880-1939), politician (BVP), member of the Reichstag
- Sieglinde Hofmann (born 1945), former member of the Red Army Faction (RAF)
- Waldemar Heckel (born 1949), leading authority and historian of Alexander the Great

=== Associated people ===
- Andreas Baader (1943-1977), leading terrorist of the Red Army Faction (RAF)

== See also ==
- Asteroid 435950 Bad Königshofen, named after the spa town
