= Cornelia Prüfer-Storcks =

German politician

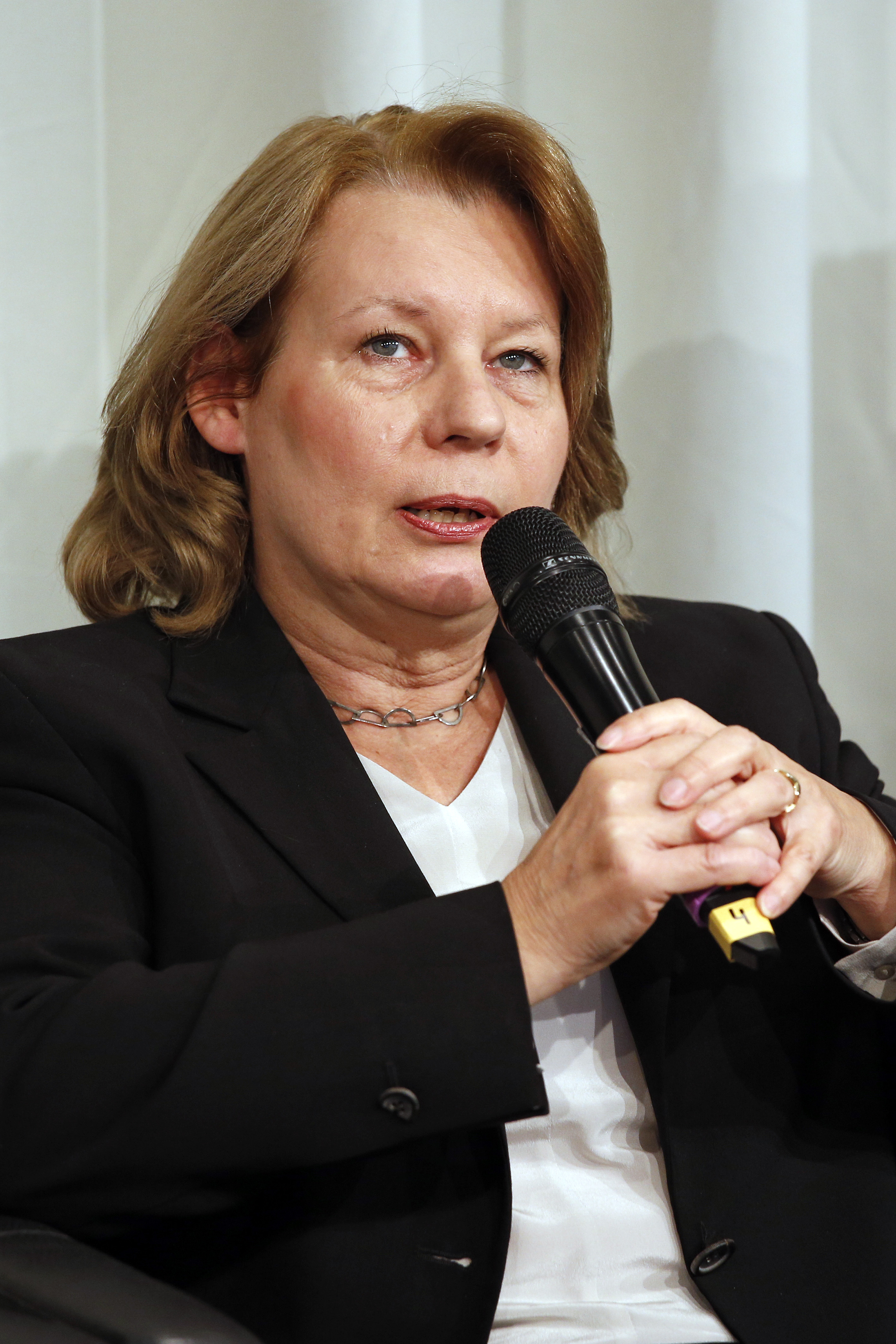

Cornelia Prüfer-Storcks (born 8 May 1956) is a German politician (SPD) who served as State Minister (Senator) for Health and Consumer Protection of the city state of Hamburg in the Senates Scholz I, II and Tschentscher from 2011 until 2020.

== Early life and career ==
Prüfer-Storcks was born in Essen. After graduating from high school in 1975 and completing a journalistic traineeship, she initially worked as an editor, among others at the Dortmund newspaper of Ruhr Nachrichten. In 1988, she joined the State Chancellery of the State of North Rhine-Westphalia as a consultant. Two years later she joined the newly established Equal Rights Ministry as press spokeswoman. In 1995, she became head of the Department of Women's Politics there.

== Political career ==
From 1998 to 1999 Prüfer-Storcks was Deputy Secretary of State of Karl Pröbsting in the State Ministry of Women, Youth, Family and Health of North Rhine-Westphalia. After his death in 1999, she was appointed his successor. Until the change of government in 2005, Prüfer-Storcks was State Secretary in the Ministry, which was renamed the State Ministry of Health, Social Affairs, Women and Family in 2002 as part of the reorganization of the ministries. From 2007 until her appointment to the Hamburg Senate, she was a member of the board of the health insurance of AOK Rheinland / Hamburg.

Following the 2011 state elections, Prüfer-Storcks has been Senator of the city state of Hamburg. From 23 March to 30 April 2011, she was President of the Department of Social Affairs, Family, Health and Consumer Protection for the sector of Health and Consumer Protection. After hiving off individual departments and the new formation of the Authority for Health and Consumer Protection, she took over on 1 May 2011 as President of this authority. As one of the state’s representatives at the Bundesrat since 2011, she is a member of the Committee on Health.

In the negotiations to form a Grand Coalition of Chancellor Angela Merkel's Christian Democrats (CDU together with the Bavarian CSU) and the SPD following the 2013 federal elections, Prüfer-Storcks was part of the SPD delegation in the working group on health policy, led by Jens Spahn and Karl Lauterbach. Appointed by Federal Minister of Health Hermann Gröhe, she served as member of an expert commission on the reform of Germany’s hospital care from 2015 until 2017.

== Controversy ==
Prüfer-Storcks became widely known in May / June 2011 in connection with the Northern European EHEC epidemic. After cucumbers, lettuce and tomatoes were initially suspected of causing the outbreak, sprouts soon became the focus of investigation, with evidence of traceability of delivery routes. Later it was determined that the pathogens probably came from Egypt to Germany via fenugreek seeds that were used to produce lettuce sprouts. In the meantime, especially cucumbers were in the focus of public interest, as investigations by the Hamburg Institute of Hygiene had found an EHEC pathogen on cucumbers from Spain. However, as emerged in the following investigations of the institute and was rectified by the authority immediately, this was not the causative agent responsible for the outbreak. The Spanish government then announced that it was investigating a claim for damages against Germany.
