= Carsten Brosda =

German politician

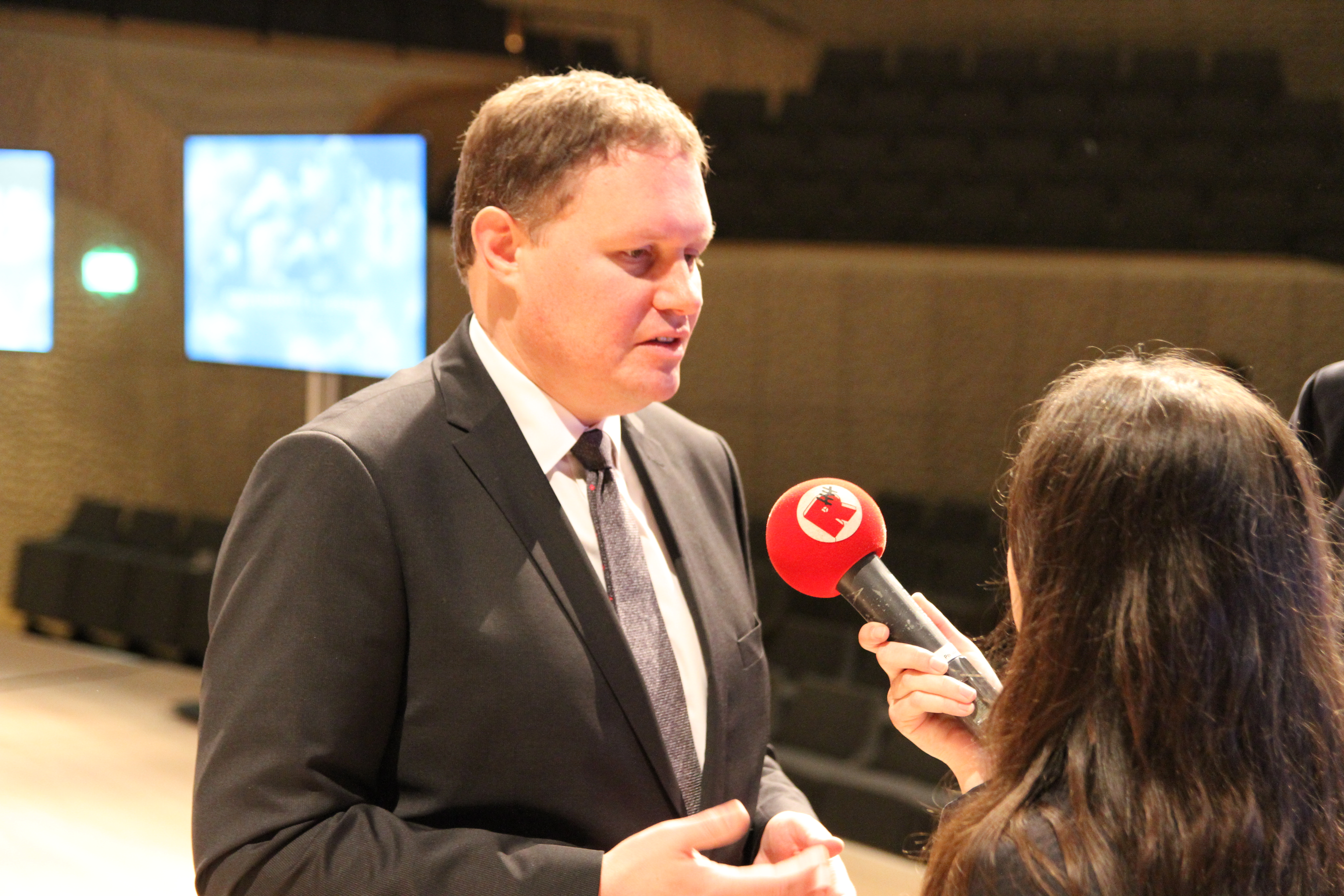
Brosda in 2017

Carsten Brosda (born 3 October 1974) is a German politician of the Social Democratic Party (SPD) who has been serving as State Minister (Senator) and head of the Hamburg Authority for Culture and Media in the Senates Scholz II and Tschentscher since February 2017.

== Early life and career ==
Brosda was born in Gelsenkirchen. As an exchange student, he spent a year in Texas, USA, where he came into contact with the job profile journalism on a high school course. He studied Journalism and Political Science at the Technical University of Dortmund and completed an internship at the Westdeutsche Allgemeine Zeitung in Essen. He also completed an internship at the press office of the SPD presidium in Berlin. Subsequently, the SPD offered him a half-day job, which allowed him to earn a doctorate incidentally. In 2007 he received his doctorate with a dissertation on "Discursive Journalism" at the faculty of cultural studies at the University of Dortmund. For several years he worked as a lecturer at various German universities.

From 2000 to 2005 Brosda worked in various positions as a press officer, editor, speechwriter and policy speaker at the Party Executive of the SPD in Berlin. During Gesine Schwan's candidature for the Office of the German President 2004 he was her press secretary. From 2005 to 2009, he was in charge of the Speech, Lectures and Analysis Unit at the Federal Ministry of Labour and Social Affairs (BMAS) and from 2008 was also deputy head of the Management and Planning Staff. From 2007 to 2009 he worked under the then Federal Minister of Labor and Social Affairs, Olaf Scholz.

From 2010 to 2011 Brosda was head of the communication department of the SPD party executive committee, until in June 2011 the First Mayor of Hamburg, Olaf Scholz, appointed him as head of his newly created Media Office in the Hamburg Senate Chancellery. From 2013, Brosda was also representative of the Senate of Hamburg for the media.

== Political career ==
On 1 March 2016, Brosda was appointed as State Councillor of the Senate Chancellery for the Media and Digitization, as well as State Councillor of the Culture Authority in the Senate Scholz II. He succeeded Horst-Michael Pelikahn in the Culture Authority.

On 1 February 2017, Brosda succeeded Barbara Kisseler, who died in October 2016, as Senator for Culture in the Senate Scholz II and Senate Tschentscher. In the negotiations to form a so-called traffic light coalition of the SPD, the Green Party and the FDP under Chancellor Olaf Scholz following the 2021 federal elections, Brosda was part of his party's delegation in the working group on cultural affairs and media; his co-chairs from the other parties were Claudia Roth and Otto Fricke.

== Other activities ==
- Deichtorhallen, Ex-Officio Chair of the Supervisory Board
- Filmförderung Hamburg Schleswig-Holstein, Ex-Officio Chair of the Supervisory Board
- German Federal Cultural Foundation, Member of the Board of Trustees
- German Federal Film Board (FFA), Ex-Officio Substitute Member of the Supervisory Board
- Hamburg State Opera, Ex-Officio Chair of the Supervisory Board
- Cultural Foundation of the German States (KdL), Ex-Officio Member of the Council
- Thalia Theater, Ex-Officio Chair of the Supervisory Board
- Hamburg Marketing Gesellschaft mbH (HMG GmbH), Ex-Officio Member of the Supervisory Board
- Friedrich Ebert Foundation (FES), Member of the Board of Trustees
- ZDF, Member of the Program Committee

== Personal life ==
Brosda is married and has two children.

== Works ==
- Along with Thomas Meyer und Christian Schicha: Diskurs-Inszenierungen: zur Struktur politischer Vermittlungsprozesse am Beispiel der "Ökologischen Steuerreform"., Wiesbaden: Westdeutscher Verlag, 2001, ISBN 3-531-13568-6.
- Diskursiver Journalismus: journalistisches Handeln zwischen kommunikativer Vernunft und mediensystemischem Zwang., Wiesbaden: VS Verlag für Sozialwissenschaften, 2008 (dissertation), ISBN 978-3-531-15627-9.
