= Ulrike Bahr =

German politician

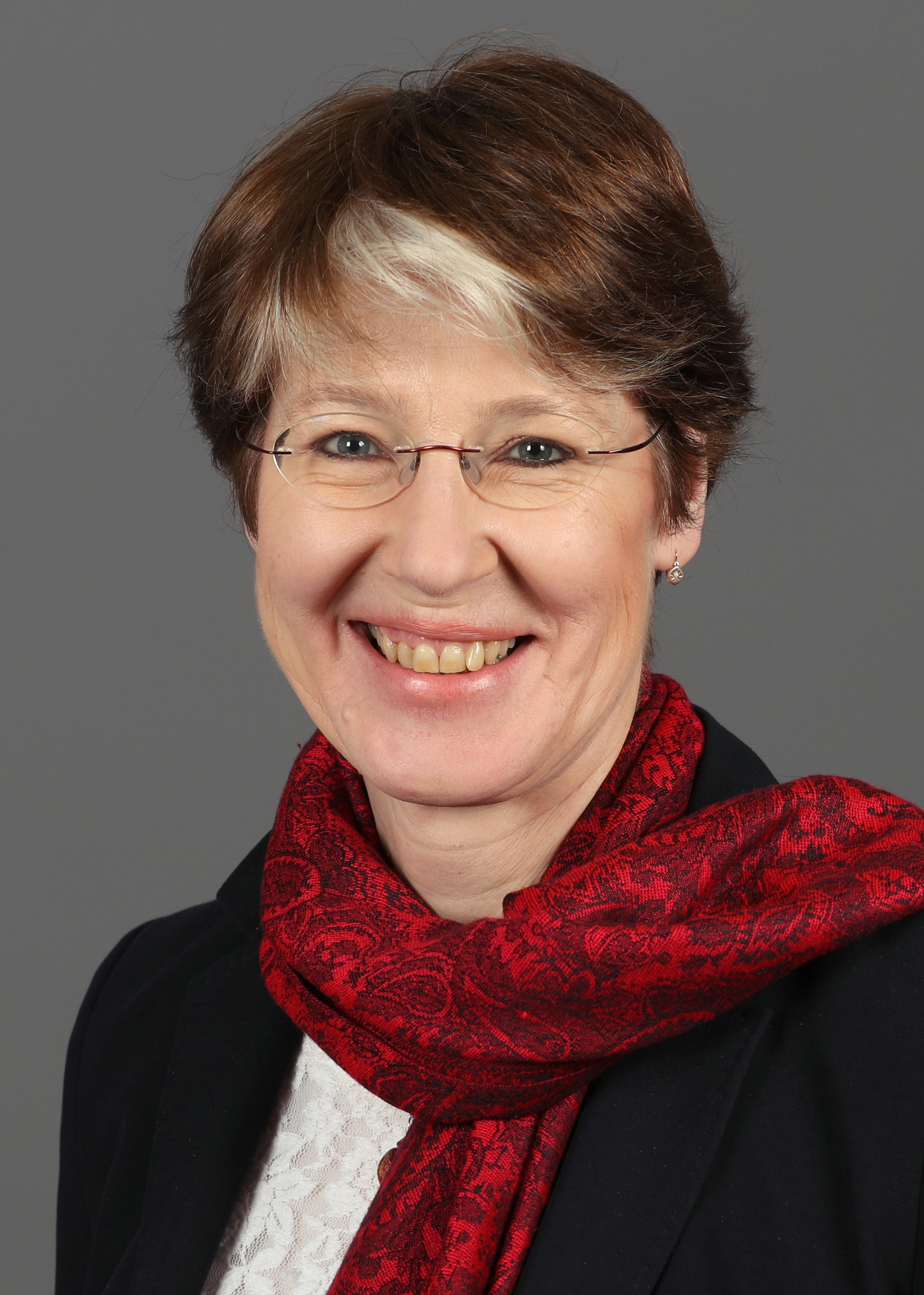

Member of the Bundestag
- Incumbent
- Assumed office 2013

Personal details
- Born: Ulrike Renate Martina Bahr; 25 April 1964 (age 62) Nördlingen, Bavaria, West Germany
- Party: Social Democratic Party

Ulrike Renate Martina Bahr (German pronunciation: [ʊlˈʁiːkə ˈbaːɐ̯]; born 25 April 1964) is a German politician of the Social Democratic Party (SPD) and since 2013 MP in the Bundestag. She belongs to the left party wing of the SPD, the Parliamentary Left (Parlamentarische Linke). Between 2018 and 2019, she was one of the members of the SPD parliamentary group who voted most often against the party line.

== Early career ==
Bahr was born in Nördlingen, but grew up in Wemding and attended the local primary school, where her father worked as a teacher, from 1970 to 1974. In 1974 she moved to the Theodor Heuss High School in Nördlingen, where she graduated in 1983. She then studied English, history, German and music at the University of Augsburg to become a secondary school teacher. In 1989 she obtained the first state examination and became a trainee teacher in Wemding. She graduated in 1991 with the Second State Examination.

Bahr worked as a secondary school teacher in Monheim and Wemding. From 1993 she was employed at various schools in Augsburg as a teacher.

== Political career ==
=== Career in local politics ===
In 1986, Bahr became a member of the SPD. From 2002 to 2012 she sat in the city council of Augsburg. From 2009 to 2012 she was the chairwoman of the SPD Ortsverein (local association) Jakobervorstadt/Bleich. She also was elected chairwoman of the SPD Augsburg.

=== Member of Parliament, 2013–present ===
In 2012, Bahr stood as a candidate for the Bundestag. She announced that she would give up her mandate in the city council after a successful election, as she sought no double mandate. Since 2013, she has been deputy chairwoman of the SPD Swabia.

In 2013, Bahr ran for the Bundestag in the constituency of Augsburg-Stadt and was elected via the list of her party. In parliament, she has since been a member of the Committee on Families, Senior Citizens, Women and Youth, where she is her parliamentary group's rapporteur on children, adolescents, and prostitution. In addition, she was a member of the Subcommittee on Citizenship and the German-American Parliamentary Friendship Group.

Since the 2021 elections, Bahr has been chairing the Committee on Families, Senior Citizens, Women and Youth.

Within the SPD parliamentary group, Bahr belongs to the Parliamentary Left, a left-wing movement.

== Other activities ==
- Augsburg University of Applied Sciences, member of the board of trustees
- swa Netze GmbH, member of the supervisory board (-2014)
- Education and Science Workers' Union (GEW), member
