= Otto Bohl =

Mayor of Augsburg from 1930 to 1933

Mayor of Augsburg
- In office January 1930 – 31 May 1933
- Preceded by: Kaspar Deutschenbaur
- Succeeded by: Edmund Stoeckle

Personal details
- Born: 8 May 1885; Ludwigshafen, Imperial Germany
- Died: 24 October 1969 (aged 84); Illertissen, West Germany
- Political party: Bavarian People's Party

Otto Bohl (8 May 1885, Ludwigshafen – 24 October 1969, Illertissen) was a German lawyer and politician who served as the mayor of Augsburg from January 1930 to 31 May 1933 when he was removed from office by the Nazi Party. He was a member of the Bavarian People's Party. He studied legal science in Heidelberg and Munich. From 1948 till 1958 he was the Landrat of district Illertissen.
