= Maximilian Funke-Kaiser =

German politician (born 1993)

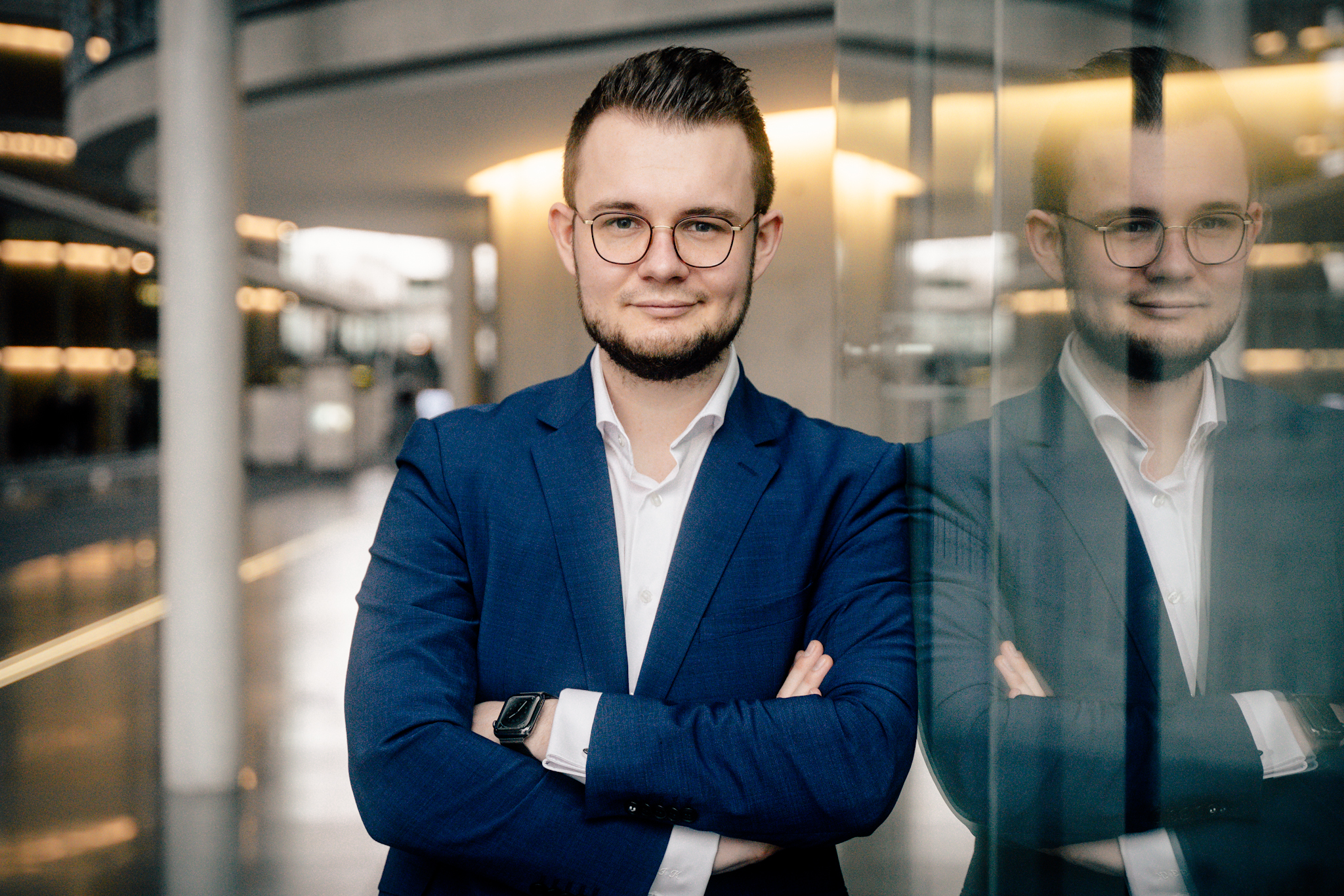
Maximilan Funke-Kaiser in 2022.

Maximilian Funke-Kaiser (born 17 August 1993) is a German politician of the Free Democratic Party (FDP) who served as a member of the Bundestag from Bavaria from 2021 to 2025.

== Life and politics ==
Funke-Kaiser was born in 1993 in Augsburg and graduated from the University of Augsburg. He was elected to the Bundestag in 2021.
