= Nikolaus Müller =

German politician

Mayor of Augsburg
- In office 1947–1964
- Preceded by: Heinz Hohner
- Succeeded by: Wolfgang Pepper

Personal details
- Born: April 19, 1892; Augsburg, Imperial Germany
- Died: August 6, 1980 (aged 88); Augsburg, Germany
- Political party: Christian Social Union of Bavaria

Nikolaus Josef Müller (April 19, 1892, Augsburg – August 6, 1980, ibid.), also known as Klaus Müller, was a German politician who served as the mayor of Augsburg from 1947 to 1964. He was a member of the Christian Social Union of Bavaria.
