= Wilhelm Ott =

German mayor (1886–1969)

Wilhelm Ott (12 April 1886 – 6 January 1969) was briefly the mayor of Augsburg, Germany, in 1945.

He was a member of the Bavarian People's Party, and, as interim mayor, was heavily involved in the transfer of power from the Nazi Party to the Allied Forces at the end of World War II.
