= Ties Rabe =

German politician (born 1960)

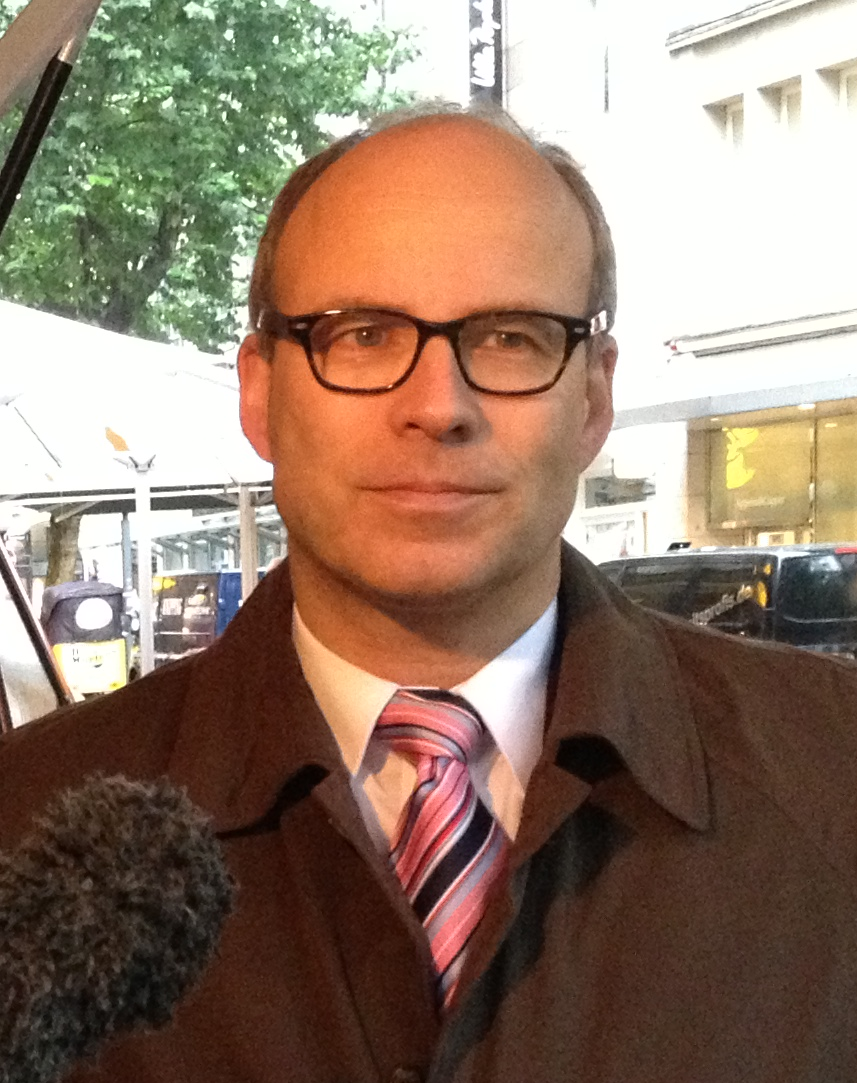
Ties Rabe (2012)

Ties Rabe (born 14 November 1960) is a German teacher and politician of the Social Democratic Party (SPD). He has been State Minister (Senator) for School and Vocational Training of the city state of Hamburg since March 2011 and was previously a member of the Hamburgische Bürgerschaft, the Hamburg Parliament from 2008.

== Education and early career ==
Rabe was born in Hamburg. After graduating from Wentorf grammar school in 1979 and his civil service in the Bethesda Hospital in Bergedorf, Hamburg, from 1981 to 1989, he trained as a teacher of religion, German language and history.

From 1990 to 2002 Rabe was editor and editorial director in the Elbe-Wochenblatt-Verlag. From 2006 until his appointment as Senator of the Authority for School and Vocational Training in 2011, he worked as a teacher at the high school of Luisen-Gymnasium Hamburg.

== Political career ==
Rabe has been chairman of SPD Bergedorf since 2001 and from 2002 to 2006 Managing Director of the SPD Hamburg. His dismissal as managing director of the Hamburg SPD in the late summer of 2006 led to criticism in parts of the SPD, and also the media reported on the case. In the spring of 2007, he was elected again after a serious crisis of the Hamburg SPD as a member of its state executive committee.

In February 2008, Rabe moved into the Hamburg Parliament in the state elections, for the constituency of Bergedorf. There he acted as a spokesman for his parliamentary group for education and school. He also was a member of the school and environmental committee of the parliament.

On 16 March 2011 it was announced that Rabe would become State Minister for Education of the city state of Hamburg. On 23 March 2011 he was appointed Senator and President of the Authority for School and Vocational Training, and his appointment was confirmed by the state parliament (Senate Scholz I). His parliamentary mandate rests during membership in the Senate, which also continued in the Senates Scholz II and Tschentscher.

As one of the state’s representatives at the Bundesrat since 2011, Rabe is a member of the Committee on Education. He also served as President of the Conference of State Ministers of Education (KMK) in 2012. Since 2015, he has been acting as coordinator of the SPD-governed federal states for education and science and co-opted member of the executive committee of the Kultusministerkonferenz.

In the negotiations to form a fourth coalition government under Chancellor Angela Merkel following the 2017 federal elections, Rabe was part of the working group on education policy, led by Annegret Kramp-Karrenbauer, Stefan Müller and Hubertus Heil.

In the negotiations to form a so-called traffic light coalition of the SPD, the Green Party and the Free Democrats (FDP) on the national level following the 2021 German elections, Rabe was part of his party's delegation in the working group on education policy, co-chaired by Andreas Stoch, Felix Banaszak and Jens Brandenburg.

== Personal life ==
Rabe has been married since 1983. The couple has three children.
