= Kaspar Deutschenbaur =

Mayor of Augsburg from 1919 to 1929

Mayor of Augsburg
- In office 1919–1929
- Preceded by: George von Wolfram
- Succeeded by: Otto Bohl

Personal details
- Born: 1 November 1864; Schwabmünchen
- Died: 23 November 1950 (aged 86); Dießen am Ammersee, West Germany
- Political party: Bavarian People's Party

Kaspar Deutschenbaur (1 November 1864, Schwabmünchen – 23 November 1950, Dießen am Ammersee) was a German politician who served as the mayor of Augsburg from 1919 to 1929. He was a member of the Bavarian People's Party.
