= Kurt Gribl =

German politician

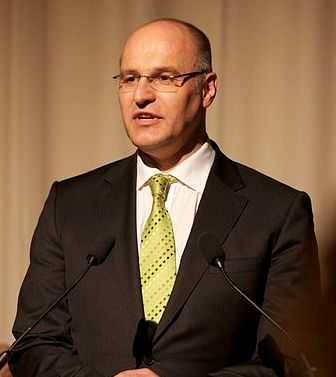
Mayor Kurt Gribl.

Kurt Gribl (born 29 August 1964 Augsburg, Germany) is a former Mayor of Augsburg, Bavaria, an office he held from 1 May 2008 to 30 April 2020. He is a member of the Christian Social Union of Bavaria.

== Early career ==
Gribl has been practicing law since 1993 when he joined a law firm in Augsburg. He specialized in building and architectural law. In addition, he held teaching positions at Hochschule Mittweida and Hochschule für Technik und Wirtschaft Dresden between 2004 and 2007.

== Political career ==
Gribl joined the CSU in 2008. In 2015, Bavaria's Minister President Horst Seehofer nominated him as one of his deputies in the office of CSU chairman, making him part of the party's leadership.

In the negotiations to form a coalition government under the leadership of Chancellor Angela Merkel following the 2017 federal elections, Gribl co-chaired the working group on urban development; his counterparts were Bernd Althusmann and Natascha Kohnen.

In March 2019, Gribl announced that he would not stand in the 2020 local elections but instead resign from active politics by the end of his term.

== Other activities ==
=== Corporate boards ===
- BayernLB, member of the supervisory board (since 2017)
- Housing Association of the City of Augsburg (WBG), chairman of the supervisory board
- echion media AG, member of the supervisory board (since 2003)

=== Non-profit organizations ===
- University of Augsburg, member of the board of trustees

== Recognition ==
- 2012 – Manhae Prize
