= Otto Weinkamm =

German politician

Member of the Bundestag; for Augsburg-Stadt
- In office 15 October 1957 – 19 October 1965
- Preceded by: Josef Ferdinand Kleindinst
- Succeeded by: Anton Ott

Minister for Justice of Bavaria
- In office 5 June 1952 – 14 December 1954
- Minister-President: Hans Ehard
- Preceded by: Josef Müller
- Succeeded by: Fritz Koch

Member of the Landtag of Bavaria; for Lindau
- In office 22 February 1953 – 11 October 1957
- Preceded by: Wilhelm Göttler
- Succeeded by: Ludwig Leichtle

Personal details
- Born: 13 February 1902 Aschaffenburg, Germany
- Died: 27 January 1968 (aged 65) Augsburg, West Germany
- Party: Christian Social Union
- Other political affiliations: BVP (1930–1933)
- Education: LMU Munich

Otto Weinkamm (13 February 1902 – 27 January 1968) was a German politician who served as the mayor of Augsburg in 1946. He was a member of the Christian Social Union in Bavaria and of the BVP. He represented the Augsburg-Stadt electoral district which covered the city in the Bundestag from 1957 to 1965.
