= Franz Josef von Gruben =

German Catholic social politician, poet, lawyer and artist

Franz Josef Freiherr von Gruben (13 February 1829, Düsseldorf – 23 October 1888, Regensburg) was a 19th-century German Catholic social politician, member of the German Reichstag, poet, lawyer, artist and Head of the Princely House of Thurn und Taxis in Regensburg.

== Life ==
Franz Gruben was born on 13 February 1829 in Düsseldorf. He attended the Friedrich-Wilhelm-gymnasium in Cologne until 1847 and studied law and political science in Berlin and Bonn. He enlisted in the Royal service of Justice at the District Court in Cologne in 1850, and in 1856 he was appointed the district court assistant judge. Then he worked with the Royal Government in Koblenz until the autumn of 1857, when he left the civil service in 1858 to take a position in the administration of the Princely House of Thurn und Taxis. There, he became Head of the overall management until 1877 when he retired.

From 1881 until his death on 23 October 1888 in Regensburg, he was a member of the German Reichstag for the constituency of Upper Palatinate, Regensburg, Burglengenfeld, Stadtamhof and the German Centre Party.

=== Works ===
- Die soziale Frage – Speech on the 31st General Assembly of the Catholics of Germany to Amberg, 1 September 1884.
- Die Sozialpolitik der Kirche – History of the social development in the Christian west, Regensburg, 1881.
