= Hans Breuer (politician) =

German politician (1930–2021)

Mayor of Augsburg
- In office 1972–1990

Personal details
- Born: 16 September 1930
- Died: 13 June 2021 (aged 90)
- Party: Social Democratic
- Occupation: Politician

Hans Breuer (16 September 1930 – 13 June 2021) was the mayor of Augsburg for eighteen years between 1972 and 1990. He was a Sudeten German and a member of the Social Democratic Party of Germany. One of his most memorable achievements was the grand celebration of Augsburg's 2,000 years of existence in 1985. In 1991 Breuer became an honorary citizen of the city of Augsburg.
