= Barbara Kisseler =

German politician

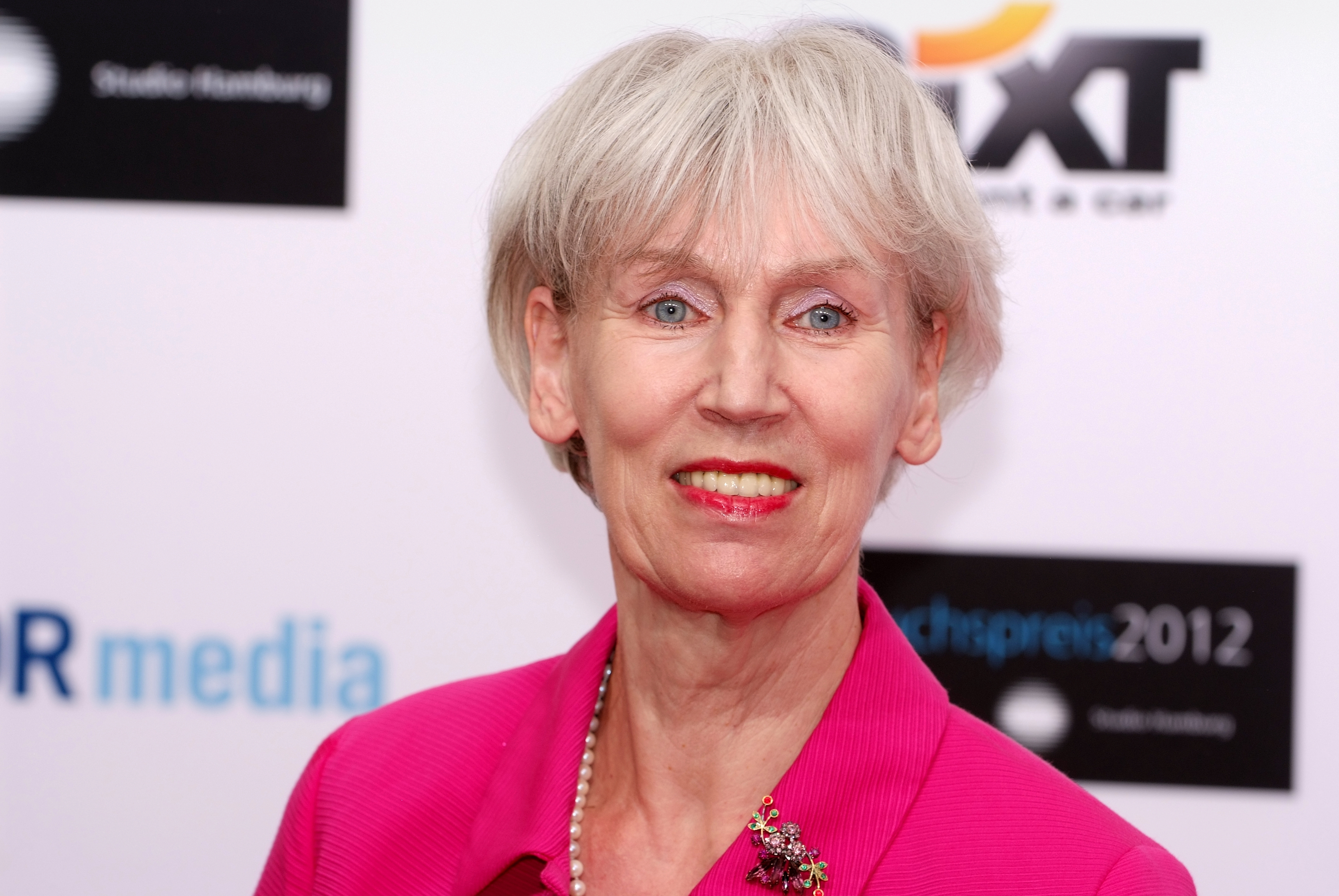

Personal details
- Born: 8 September 1949 Asperden, Cleves, Germany
- Died: 7 October 2016 (aged 67)

Barbara Kisseler (8 September 1949 – 7 October 2016) was a German politician. She served as culture senator in the Senate of Hamburg.

She was born in Asperden, Cleves. Kisseler studied theater, film and television sciences, German studies and education at the University of Cologne. She began working for Deutschlandfunk, then Westdeutscher Rundfunk and the Carl Duisberg Society. In 1982, she became head of the department of culture for the city of Hilden. She became manager of the cultural office for the city of Düsseldorf in 1986. From 1993 to 2003, she was head of the Department of Culture for the Ministry of Science and Culture in Lower Saxony. From 2003 to 2006, she was Secretary of state for Culture in the Berlin Senate Department for Science, Research and Culture. From 2006 to 2011, she was head of the Senate Chancellery for Berlin. In 2006, she was named honorary professor in the cultural studies program at the Fachhochschule Potsdam.

She was appointed cultural senator for the city-state of Hamburg in 2011. In 2015, she became president of the Deutscher Bühnenverein.

She died at the age of 67 after an extended illness.
