= Boroughs and quarters of Hamburg =

Administrative-territorial entities

Coordinates: 53°35′00″N 9°59′00″E

The city of Hamburg in Germany is made up of seven boroughs (German: Bezirke, also known as districts or administrative districts) and subdivided into 104 quarters (German: Stadtteile). Most of the quarters were former independent settlements. The areal organisation is regulated by the constitution of Hamburg and several laws. The subdivision into boroughs and quarters was last modified in March 2008.

== Borough overview ==
No.	Borough	Area in km^{2}	Population (31 December 2019)	Population density (inhabitants per km^{2})	Quarters	Head of Borough Administration
1	Hamburg-Mitte	142.2	301,543	2121	19	Falko Droßmann (SPD)
2	Altona	77.9	275,264	3534	14	Stefanie von Berg (Grüne)
3	Eimsbüttel	49.8	267,051	5362	9	Kay Gätgens (SPD)
4	Hamburg-Nord	57.8	314,593	5442	13	Michael Werner-Boelz (Grüne)
5	Wandsbek	147.5	441,012	2990	18	Thomas Ritzenhoff (SPD)
6	Bergedorf	154.8	130,260	841	14	Arne Dornquast (SPD)
7	Harburg	125.2	169,426	1353	17	Sophie Fredenhagen (Independent)
	Hamburg	755.2	1,899,160	2515	104	

== History ==
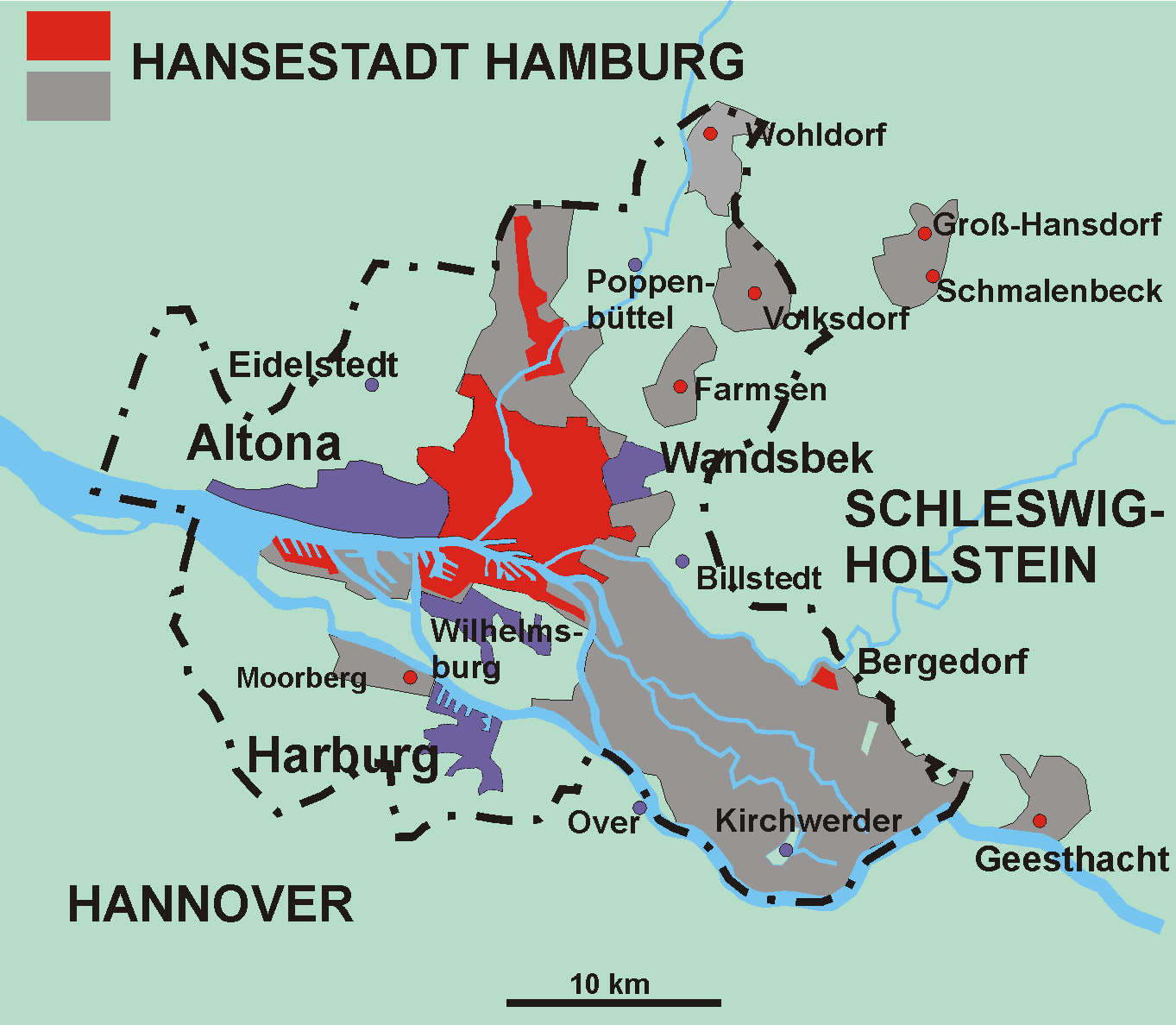
Map of Hamburg 1815–1937 Red: State of Hamburg 1815–1937 Violet: Prussian cities like Altona Grey: new localities 1937 Dotted line: Hamburg 2005

The first official administrative divisions of Hamburg were the parishes of four churches, the St. Peter's, St. Catherine's, St. James's, and St. Nicholas's Churches (or their preceding buildings). On 24 February 1529 a compromise of 132 articles between the senate of Hamburg and the citizens (German: Langer Rezeß) established a council of citizens. The twelve councilmen were called Oberalte (eldermen) and were the three oldest deacons of each parish. Each parish was given a confirmed border.

=== 1871 ===
In 1871 at the declaration of the German Reich the State of Hamburg consisted of the city of Hamburg with Altstadt (Old city), Neustadt (New city) and St. Georg (Hamburg since 1868). A suburb called St. Pauli and several directly named outskirts and the other land.

In the north former parts of the Province of Schleswig-Holstein with its municipalities Rotherbaum, Harvestehude, Eimsbüttel, Eppendorf, Winterhude, Uhlenhorst, Barmbeck, Eilbek, Hohenfelde, Borgfelde, Hamm, Horn, Billwärder-Ausschlag, Steinwärder mit Grevenhof and the Kleiner Grasbrook. Rural areas have been e.g. Großborstel, Fuhlsbüttel, Langenhorn, Alsterdorf, Ohlsdorf, Kleinborstel, Struckholt. Localities named as Walddörfer (forest villages) Farmsen with Berne, Volksdorf, Wohldorf and Olstedt, Groß-Hansdorf, and Schmalenbeck. (Note: Most names in old German spelling)

In the south rural areas between Bille and Elbe are located Billwärder an der Bille, Moorfleeth, Allermöhe, Spadenland, Tatenberg, Ochsenwärder, and Reitbrook.

Several villages and rural areas are located south of river Elbe, e.g. Moorwärder, Kaltenhofe, Peute, Die große Veddel, Die kleine Veddel, Niedernfelde, Klütjenfelde, Ellerholz, Ross, Waltershof, Mühlenwärder, Dradenau and the municipalities Finkenwärder, and Moorburg.

The city of Bergedorf and municipalities Curslak, Altengamme, Neuengamme, Kirchwärder, Krauel and Geesthacht. And the municipalities Cuxhaven, Groden, Döse, Süderwisch und Westerwisch, Stickenbüttel, Sahlenburg, Duhnen, Holte and Spangen, Arensch und Berensch, Oxstedt, Gudendorf, and the island Neuwerk.

=== The Greater Hamburg Act ===
At 1 April 1938, due to the Gesetz über Groß-Hamburg und andere Gebietsbereinigungen (Greater Hamburg Act) (from 26 January 1937), the State Hamburg lost all its rural areas, they became part of the state of Hamburg. The city also gained considerable area from the province of Schleswig-Holstein as Altona and Wandsbek both became administrative districts of Hamburg. Furthermore, rural districts Bergstedt, Billstedt, Bramstedt, Bramfeld, Duvenstedt, Hummelsbüttel, Lemsahl-Mellingstedt, Lohbrügge, Poppenbüttel, Rahlstedt, Sasel, Steilshoop und Wellingsbüttel, Kurslack im Achterschlag, and Lokstedt were added to the state's area. The Province of Hanover handed over the city district of Harburg-Wilhelmsburg. The settlements of the rural districts Altenwerder, Cranz, Finkenwerder, Fischbek, Francop, Gut Moor, Hannöversch Kirchwerder, Langenbek, Marmstorf, Neuenfelde, Neugraben, Neuland, Rönneburg, Sinstorf, and parts of Over therefore became quarters within the state's borders.

Hamburg lost Cuxhaven, Geesthacht, Schmalenbeck, Groß Hansdorf, and the isles of Neuwerk, Scharnhörn, and Niegehörn.

=== 1945 and later ===
In 1969 the isles were handed back to Hamburg and administered from the borough of Hamburg-Mitte ever since.

1 March 2008 the quarter Wilhelmsburg became part of the borough Hamburg-Mitte. The neighbourhood Schanzenviertel in the boroughs Altona, Eimsbüttel, and Hamburg-Mitte became the quarter Sternschanze in the borough Altona. The neighborhood HafenCity was awarded the status of a quarter.

== Boroughs ==
Boroughs of Hamburg

A borough of Hamburg is not comparable to other local administrations in Germany. The Constitution of Hamburg determines that Hamburg is both a state and a single municipality. But it allows that boroughs can be formed for the purpose of local administrative. The boroughs have minor rights to determine local administration.

=== Borough councils ===
The boroughs of Hamburg have their own local council (German: Bezirksversammlung, literally 'district assembly'). The members of the Bezirksversammlung are elected every four years under a system of proportional representation. It consists of 45, 51 or 57 representatives, depending on the population of the borough. In addition to Germans, all citizens of European Union states are entitled to vote if on the day of election they have registered their residency in Hamburg for at least three months.

The borough councils powers is mostly to be heard in questions of local importance (e.g. the location of fire brigade stations, schools etc.) and to prioritise the work of the borough administration (Bezirksamt).

=== Head of Borough Administration ===
The administrative leader of each borough is called Bezirksamtsleiter (municipal councillor) and is elected by the borough council, although they must also be confirmed by the Senat, Hamburg's state cabinet.

== Quarters ==
The 104 quarters of Hamburg are not politically independent, but have officially recognised borders. They have no self-government or administration. Historically, most quarters began as an independent rural, urban, or suburban locality and they form the basis of the state and city of Hamburg. Their historical roots as a settlement can often be observed in the endings of their names, such as Bergedorf – dorf means village and berg means mountain, so Bergedorf is the village in the mountains. Some quarters are made up of several officially recognised locations, not to be confused with by inhabitants so called neighbourhoods. In total, Hamburg is subdivided into 181 such localities (German: Ortsteile). St. Pauli quarter is much larger than the neighbourhood St. Pauli or Kiez which means the area around the Reeperbahn.

=== Areal organisation ===
Altona borough consists of the quarters Altona-Altstadt, Altona-Nord, Bahrenfeld, Blankenese, Groß Flottbek, Iserbrook, Lurup, Nienstedten, Osdorf, Othmarschen, Ottensen, Rissen, Sternschanze, and Sülldorf.

The quarters Allermöhe, Altengamme, Bergedorf, Billwerder, Curslack, Kirchwerder, Lohbrügge, Moorfleet, Neuallermöhe, Neuengamme, Ochsenwerder, Reitbrook, Spadenland, and Tatenberg belong to the Bergedorf borough.

The quarters Billbrook, Billstedt, Borgfelde, Finkenwerder, HafenCity, Hamburg-Altstadt, Hamm, Hammerbrook, Horn, Kleiner Grasbrook, Neustadt, Neuwerk, Rothenburgsort, Steinwerder, St. Georg, St. Pauli, Veddel, Waltershof, and Wilhelmsburg belong to the borough Hamburg-Mitte.

Hamburg-Nord borough is made up of the quarters Alsterdorf, Barmbek-Nord, Barmbek-Süd, Dulsberg, Eppendorf, Fuhlsbüttel, Groß Borstel, Hoheluft-Ost, Hohenfelde, Langenhorn, Ohlsdorf, Uhlenhorst, and Winterhude.

Altenwerder, Cranz, Eißendorf, Francop, Gut Moor, Harburg, Hausbruch, Heimfeld, Langenbek, Marmstorf, Moorburg, Neuenfelde, Neugraben-Fischbek, Neuland, Rönneburg, Sinstorf, and Wilstorf are quarters in the borough of Harburg.

The Wandsbek borough consists of Bergstedt, Bramfeld, Duvenstedt, Eilbek, Farmsen-Berne, Hummelsbüttel, Jenfeld, Lemsahl-Mellingstedt, Marienthal, Poppenbüttel, Rahlstedt, Sasel, Steilshoop, Tonndorf, Volksdorf, Wandsbek, Wellingsbüttel, and Wohldorf-Ohlstedt.

Eimsbüttel is split into nine quarters: Eidelstedt, Eimsbüttel, Harvestehude, Hoheluft-West, Lokstedt, Niendorf, Rotherbaum, Schnelsen, and Stellingen.

For statistical purpose, the borough Hamburg-Mitte has the group/area called "Schiffsbevölkerung" (people living on ships).

=== In alphabetical order ===
- Allermöhe
- Alsterdorf
- Altengamme
- Altenwerder
- Altona-Altstadt
- Altona-Nord
- Bahrenfeld
- Barmbek-Nord
- Barmbek-Süd
- Bergedorf
- Bergstedt
- Billbrook
- Billwerder
- Billstedt
- Blankenese
- Borgfelde
- Bramfeld
- Cranz
- Curslack
- Dulsberg
- Duvenstedt
- Eidelstedt
- Eilbek
- Eimsbüttel
- Eißendorf
- Eppendorf
- Farmsen-Berne
- Finkenwerder
- Francop
- Fuhlsbüttel
- Groß Borstel
- Groß Flottbek
- Gut Moor
- HafenCity
- Hamburg-Altstadt
- Hamm
- Hammerbrook
- Harburg
- Harvestehude
- Hausbruch
- Heimfeld
- Hoheluft-Ost
- Hoheluft-West
- Hohenfelde
- Horn
- Hummelsbüttel
- Iserbrook
- Jenfeld
- Kirchwerder
- Kleiner Grasbrook
- Langenbek
- Langenhorn
- Lemsahl-Mellingstedt
- Lohbrügge
- Lokstedt
- Lurup
- Marienthal
- Marmstorf
- Moorburg
- Moorfleet
- Neuallermöhe
- Neuenfelde
- Neuengamme
- Neugraben-Fischbek
- Neuland
- Neustadt
- Neuwerk
- Niendorf
- Nienstedten
- Ochsenwerder
- Ohlsdorf
- Osdorf
- Othmarschen
- Ottensen
- Poppenbüttel
- Rahlstedt
- Reitbrook
- Rissen
- Rönneburg
- Rothenburgsort
- Rotherbaum
- Sasel
- Schnelsen
- Sinstorf
- Spadenland
- St. Georg
- St. Pauli
- Steilshoop
- Steinwerder
- Stellingen
- Sternschanze
- Sülldorf
- Tatenberg
- Tonndorf
- Uhlenhorst
- Veddel
- Volksdorf
- Wandsbek
- Waltershof
- Wellingsbüttel
- Wilhelmsburg
- Wilstorf
- Winterhude
- Wohldorf-Ohlstedt

== See also ==
- Hamburg Metropolitan Region

== Sources ==
- Constitution of Hamburg from 6 June 1952, last change 16 May 2001 Verfassung der Freien und Hansestadt Hamburg (in German)
- Borough administration act Bezirksverwaltungsgesetz (BezVG) (in German)
- Act of the areal organisation, 6 July 2006 Gesetz über die räumliche Gliederung der Freien und Hansestadt Hamburg (RäumGiG) (in German)
- Streets and localities in Hamburg Straßen- und Gebietsverzeichnis der Freien und Hansestadt Hamburg 2008, Statistical office Hamburg and Schleswig-Holstein Statistisches Amt für Hamburg und Schleswig-Holstein, Hamburg, Germany (ISSN 0938-636X)
