= Hamburg-Wandsbek (electoral district) =

Federal electoral district of Germany

22 Hamburg-Wandsbek
- Electoral district for the Bundestag
- Hamburg-Wandsbek in 2025
- State: Hamburg
- Population: 326,900 (2019)
- Electorate: 233,483 (2021)
- Major settlements: Wandsbek
- Area: 78.8 km^{2}

Current electoral district
- Created: 1949
- Party: SPD
- Member: Aydan Özoğuz
- Elected: 2013, 2017, 2021, 2025

Hamburg-Wandsbek is an electoral constituency (German: Wahlkreis) represented in the Bundestag. It elects one member via first-past-the-post voting. Under the current constituency numbering system, it is designated as constituency 22. It is located in northeastern Hamburg, comprising the southern part of the Wandsbek borough.

Hamburg-Wandsbek was created for the inaugural 1949 federal election. Since 2013, it has been represented by Aydan Özoğuz of the Social Democratic Party (SPD).

== Geography ==
Hamburg-Wandsbek is located in northeastern Hamburg. As of the 2021 federal election, it comprises the southern part of the Wandsbek borough, specifically the quarters of Bramfeld, Eilbek, Farmsen-Berne, Jenfeld, Marienthal, Rahlstedt, Steilshoop, Tonndorf, Volksdorf, and Wandsbek.

== History ==
Hamburg-Wandsbek was created in 1949, then known as Hamburg V. In the 1949 election, it was Hamburg constituency 5. From 1953 through 1961, it was constituency 19; in the 1965 election it became constituency 17. In 1965 it was also renamed to Wandsbek, and acquired its current name in the 1976 election. In the 2002 through 2009 elections, it was constituency 23. It has been number 22 since the 2013 election.

Originally, the constituency comprised the entirety of Wandsbek borough without the quarter of Eilbek. From the 1965 election, the quarters of Marienthal, Jenfeld, and Tonndorf were transferred away from it. In the 1972 election, the quarter of Bramfeld was transferred away, but returned in the 1980 election. At the same time, it lost the quarters of Lemsahl-Mellingstedt, Duvenstedt, Wohldorf-Ohlstedt, and Bergstedt. In the 2002 election, the quarters of Marienthal, Jenfeld, and Tonndorf were returned. In the 2017 election, the constituency gained the quarter of Eilbek.

Election	No.	Name	Borders
1949	5	Hamburg V	Wandsbek borough (excluding Eilbek)
1953	19	Hamburg V	Wandsbek borough (excluding Eilbek)
1957	19	Hamburg V	Wandsbek borough (excluding Eilbek)
1961	19	Hamburg V	Wandsbek borough (excluding Eilbek)
1965	17	Wandsbek	Wandsbek borough (excluding Eilbek, Jenfeld, Marienthal, and Tonndorf quarters)
1969	17	Wandsbek	Wandsbek borough (excluding Eilbek, Jenfeld, Marienthal, and Tonndorf quarters)
1972	17	Wandsbek	Wandsbek borough (excluding Bramfeld, Eilbek, Jenfeld, Marienthal, and Tonndorf quarters)
1976	17	Hamburg-Wandsbek	Wandsbek borough (excluding Bramfeld, Eilbek, Jenfeld, Marienthal, and Tonndorf quarters)
1980	17	Hamburg-Wandsbek	Wandsbek borough (excluding Bergstedt, Duvenstedt, Eilbek, Jenfeld, Lemsahl-Mellingstedt, Marienthal, Tonndorf, and Wohldorf-Ohlstedt quarters)
1983	17	Hamburg-Wandsbek	Wandsbek borough (excluding Bergstedt, Duvenstedt, Eilbek, Jenfeld, Lemsahl-Mellingstedt, Marienthal, Tonndorf, and Wohldorf-Ohlstedt quarters)
1987	17	Hamburg-Wandsbek	Wandsbek borough (excluding Bergstedt, Duvenstedt, Eilbek, Jenfeld, Lemsahl-Mellingstedt, Marienthal, Tonndorf, and Wohldorf-Ohlstedt quarters)
1990	17	Hamburg-Wandsbek	Wandsbek borough (excluding Bergstedt, Duvenstedt, Eilbek, Jenfeld, Lemsahl-Mellingstedt, Marienthal, Tonndorf, and Wohldorf-Ohlstedt quarters)
1994	17	Hamburg-Wandsbek	Wandsbek borough (excluding Bergstedt, Duvenstedt, Eilbek, Jenfeld, Lemsahl-Mellingstedt, Marienthal, Tonndorf, and Wohldorf-Ohlstedt quarters)
1998	17	Hamburg-Wandsbek	Wandsbek borough (excluding Bergstedt, Duvenstedt, Eilbek, Jenfeld, Lemsahl-Mellingstedt, Marienthal, Tonndorf, and Wohldorf-Ohlstedt quarters)
2002	23	Hamburg-Wandsbek	Wandsbek borough (excluding Bergstedt, Duvenstedt, Eilbek, Lemsahl-Mellingstedt, and Wohldorf-Ohlstedt quarters)
2005	23	Hamburg-Wandsbek	Wandsbek borough (excluding Bergstedt, Duvenstedt, Eilbek, Lemsahl-Mellingstedt, and Wohldorf-Ohlstedt quarters)
2009	23	Hamburg-Wandsbek	Wandsbek borough (excluding Bergstedt, Duvenstedt, Eilbek, Lemsahl-Mellingstedt, and Wohldorf-Ohlstedt quarters)
2013	22	Hamburg-Wandsbek	Wandsbek borough (excluding Bergstedt, Duvenstedt, Eilbek, Lemsahl-Mellingstedt, and Wohldorf-Ohlstedt quarters)
2017	22	Hamburg-Wandsbek	Wandsbek borough (excluding Bergstedt, Duvenstedt, Lemsahl-Mellingstedt, and Wohldorf-Ohlstedt quarters)
2021	22	Hamburg-Wandsbek	Wandsbek borough (excluding Bergstedt, Duvenstedt, Lemsahl-Mellingstedt, and Wohldorf-Ohlstedt quarters)
2025	22	Hamburg-Wandsbek	Wandsbek borough (excluding Bergstedt, Duvenstedt, Lemsahl-Mellingstedt, and Wohldorf-Ohlstedt quarters)

== Members ==
The constituency has been held by the Social Democratic Party (SPD) during all but two Bundestag terms since 1949; it returned a representative from the SPD in every federal election from 1957 through 2005. Its first representative was Irma Keilhack of the SPD, who served from 1949 to 1953. The German Party (DP) candidate Albert Walter won the constituency in 1953 and served for a single term. Former member Keilhack won it back in 1957, and served until 1965. Ilse Elsner served two terms from 1965 to 1972, followed by Alfons Pawelczyk until 1980. Eugen Glombig served a single term from 1980 to 1983. Peter Zumkley was representative from then until 2002. He was succeeded by former mayor of Hamburg Ortwin Runde. The constituency was won by the Christian Democratic Union (CDU)'s Jürgen Klimke in 2009, but returned to the SPD's Aydan Özoguz in 2013. She was re-elected in 2017 and 2021.

Election	Member	Party	%
1949	Irma Keilhack	SPD	40.7
1953	Albert Walter	DP	47.6
1957	Irma Keilhack	SPD	46.3
1961	Irma Keilhack	SPD	46.2
1965	Ilse Elsner	SPD	48.2
1969	Ilse Elsner	SPD	56.1
1972	Alfons Pawelczyk	SPD	55.0
1976	Alfons Pawelczyk	SPD	48.3
1980	Alfons Pawelczyk	SPD	54.5
1983	Eugen Glombig	SPD	50.2
1987	Peter Zumkley	SPD	43.6
1990	Peter Zumkley	SPD	43.1
1994	Peter Zumkley	SPD	43.1
1998	Peter Zumkley	SPD	52.0
2002	Ortwin Runde	SPD	53.0
2005	Ortwin Runde	SPD	49.6
2009	Jürgen Klimke	CDU	36.5
2013	Aydan Özoğuz	SPD	39.9
2017	Aydan Özoğuz	SPD	34.6
2021	Aydan Özoğuz	SPD	38.7
2025	Aydan Özoğuz	SPD	32.3

== Election results ==
=== 2025 election ===
Federal election (2025): Hamburg-Wandsbek
Notes:	Blue background denotes the winner of the electorate vote. Pink background denotes a candidate elected from their party list. Yellow background denotes an electorate win by a list member, or other incumbent. A ✓ or ✗ denotes status of any incumbent, win or lose respectively.						
Party	Candidate	Votes	%	±%	Party votes	%	±%
SPD	✓ Aydan Özoğuz	57,591	32.3	▼6.3	44,504	24.9	▼9.4
CDU	Franziska Hoppermann	43,928	24.7	▲5.5	39,925	22.3	▲5.5
AfD	Peggy Heitmann	25,873	14.5	▲7.9	25,266	14.1	▲7.6
Greens	Manuel Sarrazin	23,210	13.0	▼2.4	25,956	14.5	▼4.1
Left	Thomas Iwan	18,926	10.6	▲4.5	20,488	11.5	▲6.3
BSW					8,464	4.7	New
FDP	Martina Gruhn-Bilic	5,710	3.2	▼5.9	7,345	4.1	▼7.0
Volt					2,656	1.5	▲1.0
Tierschutzpartei					2,168	1.2	▼0.3
FW	Michael Kirchhoff	2,455	1.4	New	935	0.5	▼0.1
PARTEI					830	0.5	▼0.5
BD					254	0.1	New
MLPD	Toralf Endruweit	449	0.3	▲0.2	83	<0.1	0.0
Informal votes		1,751			1,019		
Total valid votes		178,142			178,874		
Turnout		179,893	78.0	▲3.5			
SPD hold	Majority	13,663	7.6	▼11.4			

=== 2021 election ===
Federal election (2021): Hamburg-Wandsbek
Notes:	Blue background denotes the winner of the electorate vote. Pink background denotes a candidate elected from their party list. Yellow background denotes an electorate win by a list member, or other incumbent. A ✓ or ✗ denotes status of any incumbent, win or lose respectively.						
Party	Candidate	Votes	%	±%	Party votes	%	±%
SPD	✓ Aydan Özoğuz	66,616	38.7	▲4.1	59,298	34.3	▲7.7
CDU	Franziska Hoppermann	33,085	19.2	▼10.5	29,103	16.8	▼12.0
Greens	Daniel Alexander Grimm	26,599	15.4	▲8.3	32,134	18.6	▲8.2
FDP	Wieland Schinnenburg	15,755	9.1	▲2.1	19,225	11.1	▲0.8
AfD	Dietmar Wagner	11,490	6.7	▼2.8	11,290	6.5	▼3.2
Left	Johan Graßhoff	10,629	6.2	▼3.0	8,852	5.1	▼4.7
Tierschutzpartei					2,561	1.5	▲0.4
dieBasis	Michael Stein	3,054	1.8		2,481	1.4	
Team Todenhöfer					1,871	1.1	
PARTEI					1,615	0.9	▼0.3
FW					1,084	0.6	▲0.2
Pirates	Arthur Kaiser	2,068	1.2		1,048	0.6	
Volt	Luca Beitz	1,834	1.1		812	0.5	
ÖDP	Matthias Deutsch	880	0.5		427	0.2	0.0
Humanists					235	0.1	
V-Partei3					202	0.1	▼0.1
du.					169	0.1	
NPD	Helmut Saß	209	0.1	▼0.1	169	0.1	▼0.2
Bündnis 21					83	0.0	
DKP					69	0.0	0.0
MLPD	Renate Dohrn	117	0.1		49	0.0	0.0
LKR					44	0.0	
Informal votes		1,678			1,192		
Total valid votes		172,336			172,821		
Turnout		174,014	74.5	▲1.3			
SPD hold	Majority	33,531	19.5	▲14.6			

=== 2017 election ===
Federal election (2017): Hamburg-Wandsbek
Notes:	Blue background denotes the winner of the electorate vote. Pink background denotes a candidate elected from their party list. Yellow background denotes an electorate win by a list member, or other incumbent. A ✓ or ✗ denotes status of any incumbent, win or lose respectively.						
Party	Candidate	Votes	%	±%	Party votes	%	±%
SPD	✓ Aydan Özoğuz	59,086	34.6	▼5.3	45,542	26.6	▼7.9
CDU	Eckhard Graage	50,822	29.7	▼7.0	49,482	28.9	▼5.6
AfD	Dietmar Wagner	16,208	9.5	▲5.4	16,732	9.8	▲4.9
Left	Cornelia Kerth	15,673	9.2	▲2.5	16,847	9.8	▲2.1
Greens	Dennis Paustian-Döscher	12,112	7.1	▲0.2	17,773	10.4	▲1.3
FDP	Wieland Schinnenburg	12,007	7.0	▲5.1	17,621	10.3	▲5.8
PARTEI	Esther Isaak de Schmidt-Bohländer	3,026	1.8	▲1.7	2,096	1.2	▲0.8
Tierschutzpartei					1,835	1.1	
FW	Christian Walbe	1,534	0.9	▲0.4	807	0.5	▲0.1
BGE					689	0.4	
DiB					557	0.3	
ÖDP					436	0.3	▲0.1
NPD	Helmut Saß	399	0.2	▼0.7	425	0.2	▼0.6
V-Partei³					333	0.2	
MLPD					65	0.0	0.0
DKP					61	0.0	
Informal votes		1,707			1,273		
Total valid votes		170,867			171,301		
Turnout		172,574	73.3	▲5.7			
SPD hold	Majority	8,264	4.9	▲2.3			

=== 2013 election ===
Federal election (2013): Hamburg-Wandsbek
Notes:	Blue background denotes the winner of the electorate vote. Pink background denotes a candidate elected from their party list. Yellow background denotes an electorate win by a list member, or other incumbent. A ✓ or ✗ denotes status of any incumbent, win or lose respectively.						
Party	Candidate	Votes	%	±%	Party votes	%	±%
SPD	Aydan Özoğuz	58,029	40.0	▲5.2	50,339	34.6	▲5.8
CDU	Frank Schira	54,002	37.2	▲0.7	50,641	34.8	▲4.7
Left	Cornelia Kerth	9,594	6.6	▼2.9	11,078	7.6	▼3.3
Greens	Katja Husen	9,320	6.4	▼3.0	12,667	8.7	▼3.1
AfD	Joachim Körner	6,026	4.2		7,093	4.9	
Pirates	Katja Falkenbach	3,328	2.3		3,437	2.4	▲0.2
FDP	Klaus-Dieter Abend	2,783	1.9	▼5.8	6,556	4.5	▼9.1
NPD	Helmut Saß	1,374	0.9	▼0.4	1,336	0.9	▼0.2
RENTNER					793	0.5	▼0.3
FW	Ulf Ohms	737	0.5		560	0.4	
PARTEI					592	0.4	
ÖDP					229	0.2	▼0.2
MLPD					37	0.0	0.0
Informal votes		1,960			1,795		
Total valid votes		145,193			145,358		
Turnout		147,153	67.3	▼1.8			
SPD gain from CDU	Majority	4,027	2.8				

=== 2009 election ===
Federal election (2009): Hamburg-Wandsbek
Notes:	Blue background denotes the winner of the electorate vote. Pink background denotes a candidate elected from their party list. Yellow background denotes an electorate win by a list member, or other incumbent. A ✓ or ✗ denotes status of any incumbent, win or lose respectively.						
Party	Candidate	Votes	%	±%	Party votes	%	±%
CDU	Jürgen Klimke	53,958	36.5	▲0.8	44,770	30.2	▼0.4
SPD	Ingo Egloff	51,460	34.8	▼14.8	42,705	28.8	▼11.6
Left	Vasco Schultz	14,021	9.5	▲4.8	16,205	10.9	▲4.8
Greens	Anjes Tjarks	13,914	9.4	▲4.3	17,518	11.8	▲0.8
FDP	Jan Christopher Witt	11,408	7.7	▲4.2	20,181	13.6	▲4.6
Pirates					3,158	2.1	
NPD	Helmut Saß	1,972	1.3	▼0.1	1,674	1.1	▼0.2
RENTNER					1,314	0.9	
ÖDP	David Perteck	1,190	0.8		527	0.4	
DVU					261	0.2	
MLPD					50	0.0	0.0
Informal votes		2,126			1,686		
Total valid votes		147,923			148,363		
Turnout		150,049	69.1	▼7.2			
CDU gain from SPD	Majority	2,498	1.7				

=== 2005 election ===
Federal election (2005):Hamburg-Wandsbek
Notes:	Blue background denotes the winner of the electorate vote. Pink background denotes a candidate elected from their party list. Yellow background denotes an electorate win by a list member, or other incumbent. A ✓ or ✗ denotes status of any incumbent, win or lose respectively.						
Party	Candidate	Votes	%	±%	Party votes	%	±%
SPD	✓ Ortwin Runde	79,926	49.6	▼3.4	65,105	40.4	▼3.5
CDU	Jürgen Klimke	57,577	35.7	▲1.2	49,305	30.6	▲0.6
Greens	Christiane Blömeke	8,237	5.1	▼0.4	18,519	11.5	▼0.7
Left	Cornelia Kerth	7,542	4.7	▲3.5	9,827	6.1	▲4.6
FDP	Wieland Schinnenburg	5,648	3.5	▼1.4	14,572	9.0	▲2.2
NPD	Karl-Heinrich Goebel	2,256	1.4	▲0.7	2,171	1.3	▲1.1
Tierschutzpartei					1,350	0.8	
PARTEI					285	0.2	
APPD					156	0.1	
MLPD					53	0.0	
Informal votes		2,053			1,896		
Total valid votes		161,186			161,343		
Turnout		163,239	76.3	▼2.4			
SPD hold	Majority	22,349	13.9				
