= Irma Keilhack =

German politician (1908–2001)

Senator for Youth of Hamburg
- In office 13 December 1961 – 22 April 1970
- President: Paul Nevermann; Herbert Weichmann
- Preceded by: Paula Karpinski
- Succeeded by: Peter Schulz

Senator for Food and Agriculture of Hamburg
- In office 13 December 1961 – 27 April 1966
- President: Paul Nevermann; Herbert Weichmann
- Preceded by: Emilie Kiep-Altenloh
- Succeeded by: Wilhelm Eckström

Member of the Hamburg Parliament
- In office 27 April 1966 – April 1974
- Constituency: State list

Member of the Bundestag; from Hamburg
- In office 7 September 1949 – 19 January 1962
- Preceded by: Constituency established
- Succeeded by: Arthur Busch
- Constituency: Hamburg V (1949–1953); State list (1953–1957); Hamburg V (1957–1962)

Personal details
- Born: Irma Schweder; 25 January 1908 Hamburg, Germany
- Died: 3 June 2001 (aged 93) Hamburg, Germany
- Party: Social Democratic
- Spouse: Adolf Keilhack (m. 1935; died 1974)
- Children: 1

Irma Keilhack (née Schweder; 25 January 1908 – 3 June 2001) was a German politician of the Social Democratic Party (SPD). She served in the German Bundestag and the Hamburg Parliament.

== Early life ==
After elementary school, Irma Keilhack completed a commercial apprenticeship. She then worked primarily in cooperative businesses. From 1929, she was the personal assistant to the state chairman, Karl Meitmann, at the SPD state office. After the National Socialists seized power in 1933, she was temporarily imprisoned by the Gestapo. After her release, she continued her political work illegally, including raising funds for legal expenses for those politically persecuted. To earn money, she initially sold household linens and, from 1938, worked independently as a property manager with her husband, primarily managing the properties of Hamburg emigrants.

After the Second World War, Keilhack worked for the Hamburg Youth Welfare Office until her election to the Bundestag. From 1974 onwards, she headed the Hamburg Verbraucherzentrale, where in the 1970s she established the first nationwide telephone information service of a consumer advice center, entitled "Tips for Consumers" .

== Political career ==
Keilhack had already been a member of the Socialist Workers' Youth during the Weimar Republic and, from 1925, also of the SPD (Social Democratic Party). She was, for a time, chairwoman of the Young Socialists in Hamburg-Hammerbrook. From 1945 onward, she participated in the reconstruction of the Hamburg SPD. The 1954 federal party conference elected her to the program commission, which, under the leadership of Willi Eichler, drafted the Godesberg Program. In the 1960s, she was a member of the SPD's federal executive committee, and in 1946/47 and from 1966 to 1972, she also served on the state executive committee.

Irma Keilhack was elected a member of the Bundestag in the 1949 West German federal election and remained until she resigned her seat on 19 January 1962. In 1956, she successfully campaigned for the construction of a youth hostel in Bonn, funded by the Bundestag, to provide overnight accommodation for young visitors to parliament. Another of her political goals was the availability of safe food. Irma Keilhack entered the Bundestag in 1953 through the Hamburg state list and was otherwise always directly elected as the representative for the Hamburg V constituency. She was a member of the executive committee of the parliamentary group, a deputy member of the Mediation Committee, and a member of the Council of Elders.

From 1966 to 1974 she was a member of the Hamburg Parliament.

Irma Keilhack was a member of the Hamburg Senate from 13 December 1961 to 22 April 1970, which sent her as President to the Youth Authority and (until 27 April 1966) to the Authority for Food and Agriculture of the Free and Hanseatic City of Hamburg.

== Personal life ==
Keilhack was married to Adolf Keilhack, who later became a member of the Hamburg Parliament for the SPD, from 1935 until her death and had one son. In May 2017, Irma-Keilhack-Ring in Hamburg-Rahlstedt was named after her.

== Literature ==
- Rudolf Vierhaus, Ludolf Herbst (Hrsg.), Bruno Jahn (Mitarb.): Biographisches Handbuch der Mitglieder des Deutschen Bundestages. 1949–2002. Bd. 1: A–M. K. G. Saur, München 2002, ISBN 978-3-598-23782-9, S. 409.
- Keilhack, Irma. Namensbeitrag. In: AsF Hamburg (Hrsg.): Frauen im Faschismus. Frauen im Widerstand: Hamburger Sozialdemokratinnen berichten. Hamburg 1980, S. 31–34.
- Keilhack, Irma: Geprägt von der Haltung der Eltern. In: Vorstand der SPD (Hrsg.): Frauen machen, Politik. (Schriftenreihe für Frauenfragen; 4). Vorstand der SPD, Bonn 1958, S. 33–37.
- Keilhack, Irma: Gespräch mit Irma Keilhack. In: Deutscher Frauenring. Landesverband Hamburger Frauenring (Hrsg.): Lebensbilder von Frauen in Hamburg nach 1945: Gesellschaftspolitisch aktive Frauen berichten über ihre Erfahrungen in der Kriegs- und Nachkriegszeit. Landesverband Hamburger Frauenring e. V., Arbeitskreis „Frau und Arbeit“, Hamburg 1989, S. 77–85.
- Helga Kutz-Bauer, Holger Martens: Verfolgung als politische Erfahrung: Hamburger Sozialdemokraten nach 1945. Arbeitsgemeinschaft ehemals verfolgter Sozialdemokraten Hamburg (AvS), Hamburg 2013 (online).
- Heike Erlbeck: Irma Keilhack (1908–2001), SPD. In: Deutscher Bundestag (Hrsg.): Der nächste Redner ist eine Dame. Die Frauen im ersten Deutschen Bundestag. 2. Auflage, Ch. Links Verlag, Berlin 2024, ISBN 978-3-96289-210-4, S. 164–167.
