= Hummelsbüttel =

Quarter in Hamburg, Germany

- Quarter of Hamburg
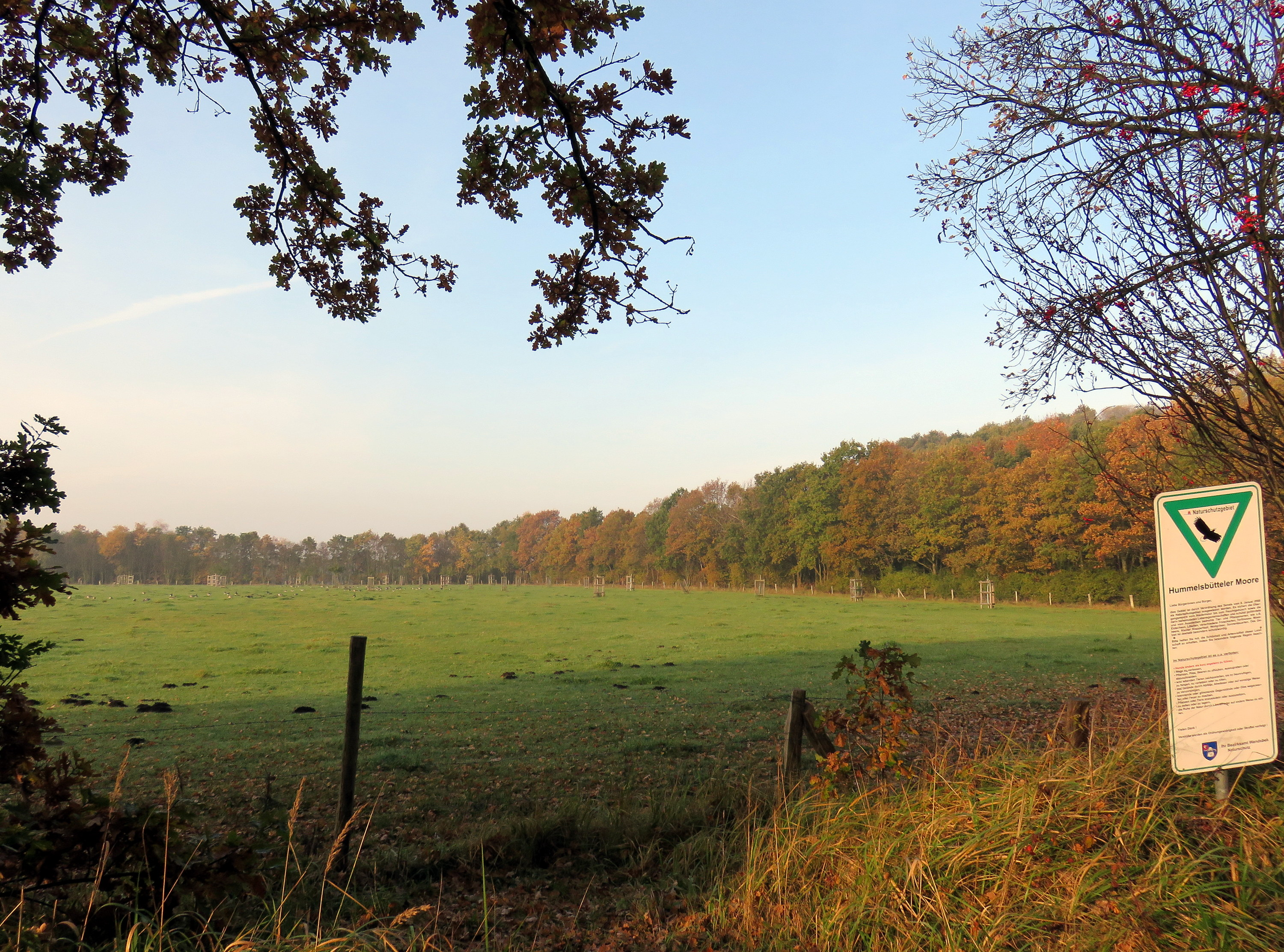
- Streuobstwiese

- Location of Hummelsbüttel in Hamburg
- Interactive map of Hummelsbüttel
- Location within Germany Location within Hamburg
- Coordinates: 53.655°N 10.050°E
- Country: Germany
- State: Hamburg
- City: Hamburg
- Borough: Hamburg-Wandsbek

Area
  - Total: 9.2 km^{2} (3.6 sq mi)

Population (2024-12-31)
  - Total: 18,731
  - Density: 2,000/km^{2} (5,300/sq mi)
- Time zone: UTC+01:00 (CET)
  - Summer (DST): UTC+02:00 (CEST)
- Dialling codes: 040
- Vehicle registration: HH

Hummelsbüttel (German pronunciation: [ˌhʊml̩sˈbʏtl̩]) is a quarter of Hamburg, Germany in the Wandsbek borough.

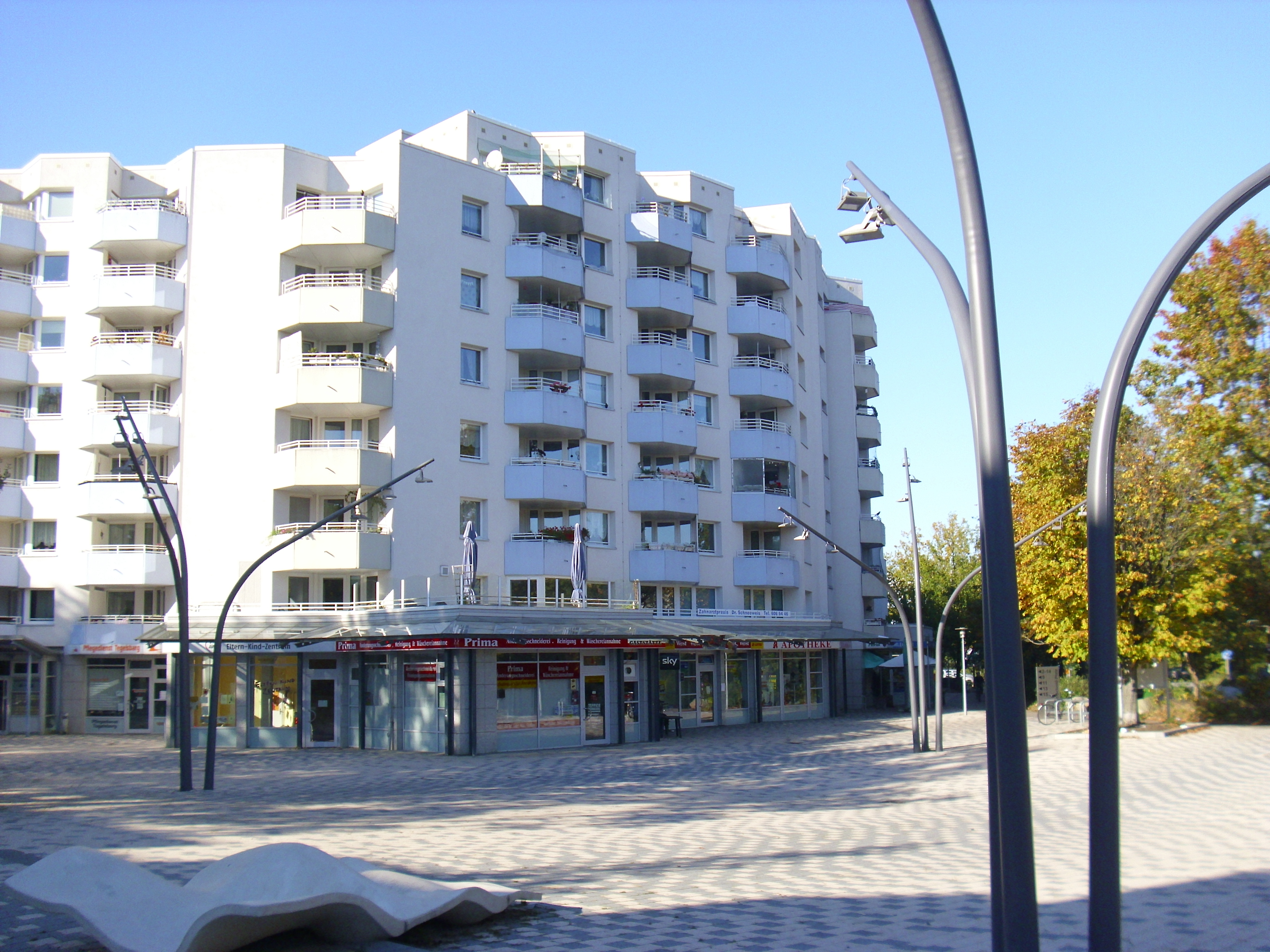
Norbert-Schmid-Platz

== Geography ==
Hummelsbüttel borders the quarters Poppenbüttel and Wellingsbüttel, as well as the quarters Langenhorn, Fuhlsbüttel, and Ohlsdorf in Hamburg-Nord.

== Politics ==
These are the results of Hummelsbüttel in the Hamburg state election:

Election	SPD	Greens	CDU	AfD	Left	FDP	Others
2020	46,1 %	17,9 %	13,3 %	7,1 %	5,9 %	4,9 %	4,8 %
2015	50,5 %	7,1 %	18,6 %	6,7 %	6,2 %	8,3 %	2,6 %
2011	50,7 %	6,7 %	25,0 %	–	5,1 %	8,2 %	4,3 %
2008	33,4 %	5,6 %	48,1 %	–	5,5 %	5,2 %	2,2 %
2004	29,8 %	7,8 %	52,9 %	–	–	3,9 %	5,6 %
2001	34,8 %	5,7 %	30,2 %	–	0,5 %	6,1 %	22,7 %
1997	35,2 %	11,4 %	33,8 %	–	0,3 %	3,6 %	15,7 %
1993	39,4 %	12,5 %	27,1 %	–	–	4,6 %	16,4 %
