= Katja Husen =

German biologist and politician (1976–2022)

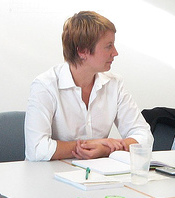
- Husen in 2006

Member of the Hamburg Parliament
- In office 17 March 2004 – 12 March 2008

Personal details
- Born: 12 June 1976 Istanbul, Turkey
- Died: 28 June 2022 (aged 46) Bayrischzell, Bavaria, Germany
- Party: Alliance 90/The Greens
- Children: 1
- Education: Technical University of Braunschweig; Vrije Universiteit Amsterdam
- Occupation: Biologist

Katja Husen (12 June 1976 – 28 June 2022) was a German biologist and politician. A member of Alliance 90/The Greens, she was speaker of the party's youth organisation, Green Youth, and served in the Hamburg Parliament from 2004 to 2008. She was CEO of the Centre for Molecular Neurobiology Hamburg.

== Early life and education ==
Husen was born in Istanbul, Turkey, on 12 June 1976, where she mostly lived until age six because of her father's job. She attended schools in Kiel, including one exchange year in Portland, Oregon. After she graduated with an Abitur in 1995, she studied biology at the Technische Universität Braunschweig and the Vrije Universiteit Amsterdam, graduating with a Diplom in 2001.

== Political career ==
In 1997, Husen joined the Alliance 90/The Greens (GAL) party. She was speaker of the party's youth organisation, Green Youth, from 1998 to 2000. She acted as a member of the party board of the Green Party in Hamburg between 2001 and 2002. Elected to the federal party board in 2002, she served as its speaker in matters of women (frauenpolitische Sprecherin) until 2006. In 2004 she was re-elected as a member of the federal party board over Anja Hajduk, the then provincial chair of the Hamburg branch of the Green Party and member of the Bundestag (German Parliament).

She served in the Hamburg Parliament from 2004 to 2008. She was speaker for health politics of the GAL fraction, and a member of the Budget Committee of the Bundestag, the health committee and the committee of consumer protection, and a substitute member of the science committee. She represented her parliamentary group in sub-committees for information and communication technology and administrative modernisation as well as for public service and human resources. She was not elected for the following term. In 2013 she was a candidate for the Bundestag representing Hamburg Wandsbek, but was not elected. In May 2019, when a new black-green coalition took office in the borough diet of Eimsbüttel, it was suggested that she be elected as the borough's municipal councillor (Bezirksamtsleiter) in replacement for a politician of the Social Democratic Party (SPD). She collected only 25 votes, one short of the necessary 26 votes.

== Professional career ==
She became CEO of the medical centre's Centre for Molecular Neurobiology of the University Medical Center Hamburg-Eppendorf in 2009. and from 2012 she was also the CEO of the centre for dental health (Zahn-, Mund- und Kieferheilkunde).

== Personal life ==
Husen suffered head injuries from a fall off her bicycle in Bayrischzell, Bavaria, on 26 June 2022, while participating with her partner in the 29th Rosenheimer Radmarathon. She died from her injuries on 28 June at a hospital. She was 46 years old.
