= Ortwin Runde =

German politician

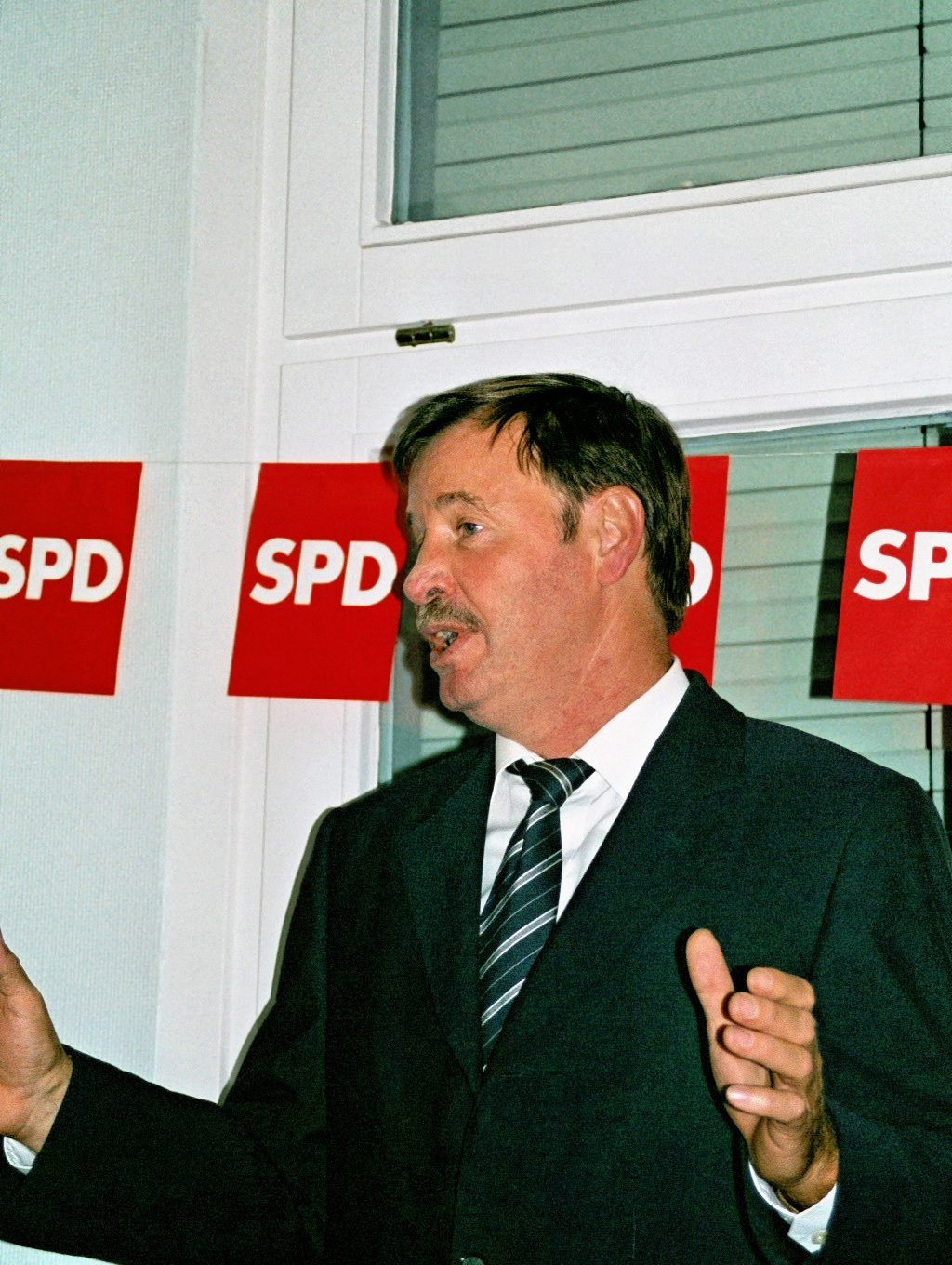
- Runde in 2002

Member of the Bundestag; for Hamburg-Wandsbek
- In office 17 October 2002 – 27 October 2009
- Preceded by: Peter Zumkley
- Succeeded by: Jürgen Klimke

First Mayor of Hamburg
- In office 12 November 1997 – 31 October 2001
- Second Mayor: Krista Sager
- Preceded by: Henning Voscherau
- Succeeded by: Ole von Beust

Senator for Finance of Hamburg
- In office 15 December 1993 – 12 November 1997
- President: Henning Voscherau
- Preceded by: Wolfgang Curilla
- Succeeded by: Ingrid Nümann-Seidewinkel

Senator for Labour, Health and Social Affairs of Hamburg
- In office 8 June 1988 – 15 December 1993
- President: Henning Voscherau
- Preceded by: Jan Ehlers (as Senator for Labour and Social Affairs); Christine Maring (as Senator for Health)
- Succeeded by: Helgrit Fischer-Menzel

Member of the Hamburg Parliament
- In office 18 April 1974 – 31 December 1980
- Preceded by: Multi-member district
- Succeeded by: Norbert Springborn
- Constituency: State list

Personal details
- Born: 12 February 1944 (age 82) Elbing, Germany (now Poland)
- Party: Social Democratic
- Children: 2
- Education: University of Münster; University of Hamburg

Ortwin Runde (born 12 February 1944) is a German politician of the Social Democratic Party (SPD). He was the First Mayor (Erster Bürgermeister) of the Free and Hanseatic City Hamburg from 1997 to 2001.

== Early life and education ==
Runde was born in Elbing (Elbląg), Danzig-Westpreußen. After receiving his high-school diploma in 1964, Runde studied Economics and Sociology at the universities of Münster and Hamburg. He received his diploma in Sociology in 1969. He entered public service in Hamburg in 1970.

== Political career ==
Runde joined the Social Democratic Party (SPD) in 1968, and was a member in the state executive of the youth organizations of the SPD (Young Socialists in the SPD) from 1969 to 1971. In 1978 he became one of deputy chairmen of Hamburg's SPD. From 1983 to 1988 he was chairman of Hamburg's SPD.

From 1974 to 1988 he was elected as a member of Hamburg's city assembly (Hamburger Bürgerschaft).

From 1988 to 1993 he was senator (as the official title in Hamburg is) of the department for labour, health and social welfare, and from 1993 to 1997 of the treasury department.

After Henning Voscherau (SPD) stepped down after internal arguments over with whom a political coalition should be formed, Runde was elected as First Mayor of the Free and Hanseatic City Hamburg on 12 November 1997. In the next election four years later, the coalition of SPD and the Green Party lost its majority, and therefore Runde had to leave his office as mayor as well on 31 October 2001.

Since 2002, Runde has been a member of the German parliament, the Bundestag.

== Personal life ==
Ortwin Runde is married and has two children.

Political offices
Preceded by Henning Voscherau	First Mayor of Hamburg; 1997–2001	Succeeded by Ole von Beust
