= Jenfeld =

Quarter in Hamburg, Germany

- Quarter of Hamburg
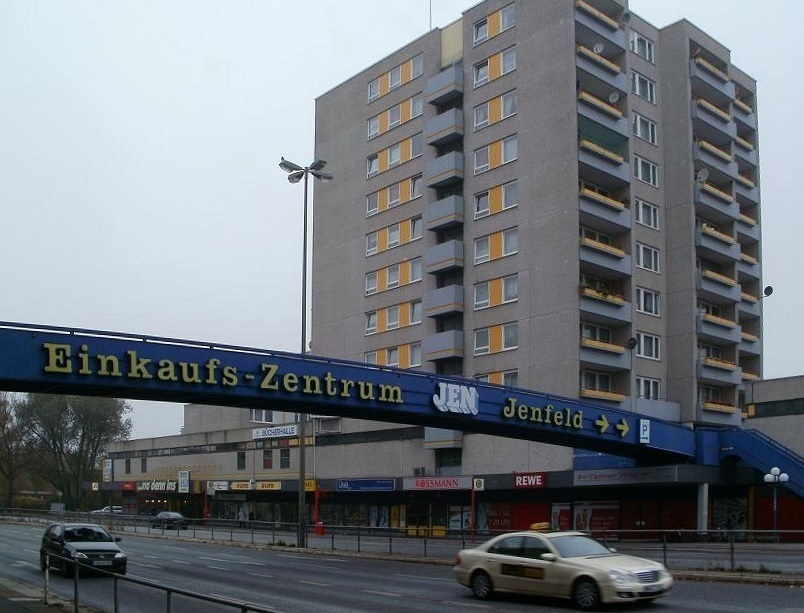
- Shopping Mall JEN

- Location of Jenfeld in Hamburg
- Interactive map of Jenfeld
- Location within Germany Location within Hamburg
- Coordinates: 53.572222°N 10.136111°E
- Country: Germany
- State: Hamburg
- City: Hamburg
- Borough: Hamburg-Wandsbek

Area
  - Total: 5.0 km^{2} (1.9 sq mi)

Population (2024-12-31)
  - Total: 29,391
  - Density: 5,900/km^{2} (15,000/sq mi)
- Time zone: UTC+01:00 (CET)
  - Summer (DST): UTC+02:00 (CEST)
- Dialling codes: 040
- Vehicle registration: HH

Jenfeld (German pronunciation: [ˈjɛnfɛlt]) is a quarter of Hamburg, Germany in the Wandsbek borough.

== Geography ==
Jenfeld borders the quarters of Billstedt, Rahlstedt, Tonndorf, and Marienthal. It also borders the town Barsbüttel in Schleswig-Holstein.

== Politics ==
These are the results of Jenfeld in the Hamburg state election:

| Election | SPD | Greens | CDU | AfD | Left | FDP | Others |
|---|---|---|---|---|---|---|---|
| 2020 | 49,1 % | 13,6 % | 10,4 % | 10,4 % | 7,1 % | 3,8 % | 5,6 % |
| 2015 | 53,7 % | 4,9 % | 14,7 % | 9,5 % | 7,9 % | 5,7 % | 3,6 % |
| 2011 | 55,7 % | 4,7 % | 21,6 % | – | 6,9 % | 5,0 % | 6,1 % |
| 2008 | 38,3 % | 3,9 % | 42,2 % | – | 7,5 % | 4,3 % | 3,9 % |
| 2004 | 32,7 % | 5,2 % | 49,2 % | – | – | 2,6 % | 10,2 % |
| 2001 | 37,6 % | 2,8 % | 26,9 % | – | 0,3 % | 3,5 % | 28,9 % |
| 1997 | 40,6 % | 6,8 % | 27,9 % | – | 0,2 % | 2,6 % | 21,9 % |
| 1993 | 46,1 % | 7,2 % | 22,7 % | – | – | 3,3 % | 20,7 % |
