= Hamburg (Bundestag electoral district) =

Electoral district in Germany

- Hamburg
- Electoral District for the Bundestag
- Location of Hamburg within Germany
- State: Hamburg
- Population: 1,973,896 (2024)
- Electorate: 1,299,289 (2025)
- Area: 755.09 km2 (291.54 sq mi)

Current Electoral District
- Created: 1949
- Seats: List: 13 – (2025–present) (Note: The number of seats allocated to the upper-tier state electoral districts is not fixed but is dependent on the national results at each election.)
- Members: List (Note: State-list members only.): Franziska Hoppermann (CDU); Christoph de Vries (CDU); Bernd Baumann (AfD); Alexander Wolf (AfD); Katharina Beck (Grüne); Jan van Aken (Linke); Cansu Özdemir (Linke)
- Constituencies: List: Hamburg-Altona; Hamburg-Bergedorf – Harburg; Hamburg-Eimsbüttel; Hamburg-Mitte; Hamburg-Nord; Hamburg-Wandsbek
- Created from: Hamburg

Hamburg (German: Hamburg) is one of the 16 multi-member upper-tier state electoral districts of the Bundestag, one of the two national legislatures of Germany. The district was created in 1949 following the restoration of democracy in West Germany with the creation of the Federal Republic of Germany. It is conterminous with the state of Hamburg. At the 2025 federal election the constituency had 1,299,289 registered electors and elected 13 of the 630 members of the Bundestag. The district's members are elected using the mixed-member proportional representation electoral system and is currently divided into 6 lower-tier constituencies.

== Constituencies ==
- Hamburg-Altona
- Hamburg-Bergedorf – Harburg
- Hamburg-Eimsbüttel
- Hamburg-Mitte
- Hamburg-Nord
- Hamburg-Wandsbek

== Election results ==
=== 2025 ===
Results of the 2025 federal election held on 23 February 2025:

Party	Constituency			Party list			Total seats	+/–
Party	Votes	%	Seats	Votes	%	Seats	Total seats	+/–
Social Democratic Party (SPD)	292,325	28.0	3	237,740	22.7	0	3	▼2
Christian Democratic Union (CDU)	232,067	22.3	1	216,935	20.7	2	3	Steady
Alliance 90/The Greens (GRÜNE)	214,621	20.6	2	201,713	19.3	1	3	▼1
The Left (DIE LINKE)	129,995	12.5	0	151,115	14.5	2	2	▲1
Alternative for Germany (AfD)	114,714	11.0	0	113,608	10.9	2	2	▲1
Free Democratic Party (FDP)	35,299	3.4	0	47,115	4.5	0	0	▼2
Sahra Wagenknecht Alliance (BSW)				41,919	4.0	0	0	New
Volt Germany	11,921	1.1	0	15,549	1.5	0	0	Steady
Human Environment Animal Protection Party				9,735	0.9	0	0	Steady
Die PARTEI				4,518	0.4	0	0	Steady
Free Voters	9,714	0.9	0	3,866	0.4	0	0	Steady
Bündnis Deutschland				1,279	0.1	0	0	New
Marxist–Leninist Party	1,642	0.2	0	528	0.1	0	0	Steady
Invalid/blank votes	8,507	–	–	5,185	–	–	–	–
Total	1,050,805	100	6	1,050,805	100	7	13	−3
Registered voters/turnout	1,299,289	80.9	–	1,299,289	80.9	–	–	–
Source: Federal Returning Officer

=== 2021 ===
Results of the 2021 German federal election:

Party	Constituency			Party list			Total seats	+/–
Party	Votes	%	Seats	Votes	%	Seats	Total seats	+/–
Social Democratic Party (SPD)	334,831	33.4	4	298,342	29.7	1	5	0
Alliance 90/The Greens (GRÜNE)	237,328	23.7	2	250,532	24.9	2	4	+2
Christian Democratic Union (CDU)	179,572	17.9	0	155,220	15.4	3	3	−1
Free Democratic Party (FDP)	84,603	8.4	0	114,602	11.4	2	2	0
The Left (DIE LINKE)	72,507	7.2	0	67,578	6.7	1	1	−1
Alternative for Germany (AfD)	49,828	5.0	0	50,537	5.0	1	1	0
Grassroots Democratic Party	17,259	1.7	0	13,961	1.4	0	0	New
Human Environment Animal Protection Party	–	–	–	12,325	1.2	0	0	0
Die PARTEI	6,585	0.7	0	10,147	1.0	0	0	0
Team Todenhöfer	–	–	–	8,952	0.9	0	0	New
Free Voters	6,743	0.7	0	5,601	0.6	0	0	0
Volt Germany	4,476	0.4	0	5,429	0.5	0	0	New
Pirate Party Germany	3,419	0.3	0	4,377	0.4	0	0	0
Ecological Democratic Party	3,666	0.4	0	2,016	0.2	0	0	0
The Urbans. A HipHop Party	–	–	–	1,341	0.1	0	0	0
V-Partei³	–	–	–	1,219	0.1	0	0	0
The Humanists	–	–	–	1,203	0.1	0	0	0
National Democratic Party	643	0.1	0	648	0.1	0	0	0
German Communist Party	–	–	–	532	0.1	0	0	0
The Pinks/Alliance 21	–	–	–	386	0.0	0	0	New
Marxist–Leninist Party	962	0.1	0	348	0.0	0	0	0
Liberal Conservative Reformers	179	0.0	0	248	0.0	0	0	New
Independents & voter groups	723	0.1	0	–	–	–	0	–
Invalid/blank votes	7,720	–	–	5,500	–	–	–	–
Total	1,011,044	100	6	1,011,044	100	10	16	0
Registered voters/turnout	1,298,792	77.8	–	1,298,792	77.8	–	–	–
Source: Federal Returning Officer

== See also ==
- List of Bundestag constituencies
