= Carl Damm =

German politician

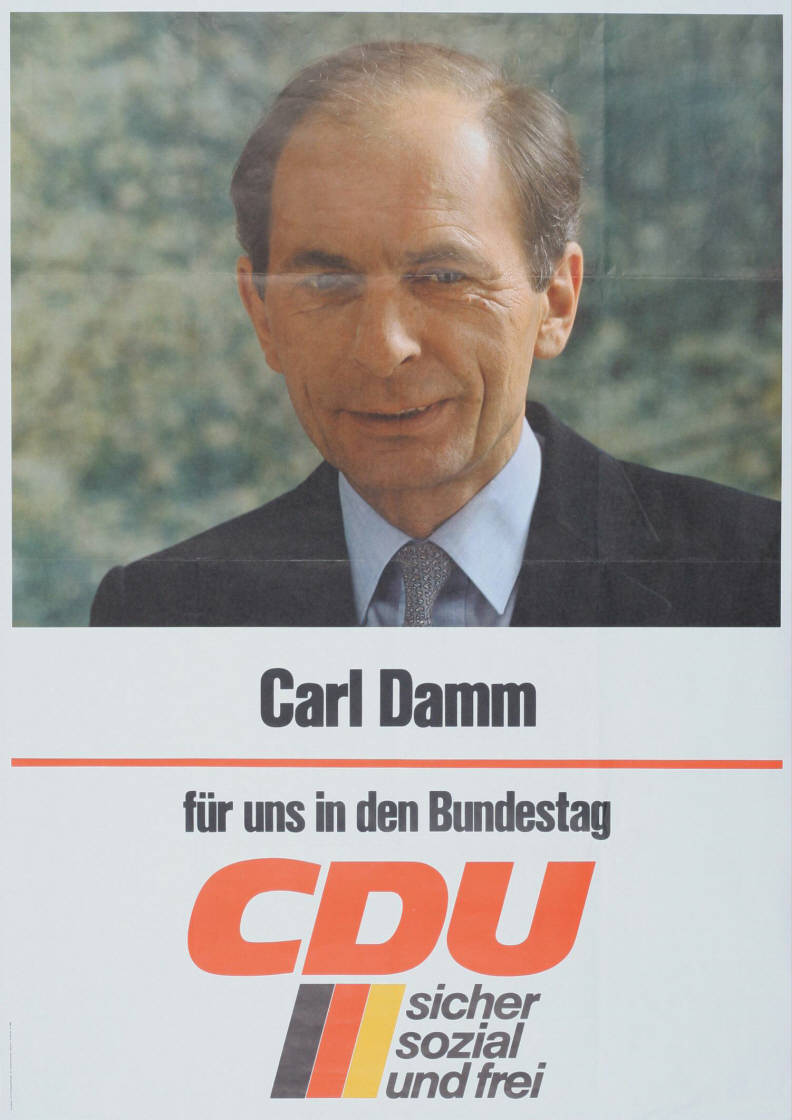
- Candidate poster Carl Damms for the 1980 federal election

Member of the Bundestag
- In office 19 October 1965 – 4 November 1980

Personal details
- Born: 20 February 1927 Koblenz
- Died: 8 December 1993 (aged 66) Hamburg, Germany
- Party: CDU
- Children: Franziska Hoppermann (granddaughter)

Carl Damm (February 20, 1927 – December 8, 1993) was a German politician of the Christian Democratic Union (CDU) and former member of the German Bundestag.

== Life ==
Damm joined the CDU after 1945 and was deputy state chairman of the Hamburg CDU from 1968 to 1974. From 1953 to 1966 Damm was a member of the Hamburg State Parliament and was a member of the Hamburg-Block Parliamentary Group in the third legislative period (1953-1957). In the 1965 federal elections he was elected to the German Bundestag, of which he was a member until 1980. He had always entered parliament via the Hamburg state list.

== Literature ==
Herbst, Ludolf; Jahn, Bruno (2002). Vierhaus, Rudolf (ed.). Biographisches Handbuch der Mitglieder des Deutschen Bundestages. 1949–2002 [Biographical Handbook of the Members of the German Bundestag. 1949–2002] (in German). München: De Gruyter - De Gruyter Saur. p. 1715. ISBN 978-3-11-184511-1.
