= Wieland Schinnenburg =

German politician

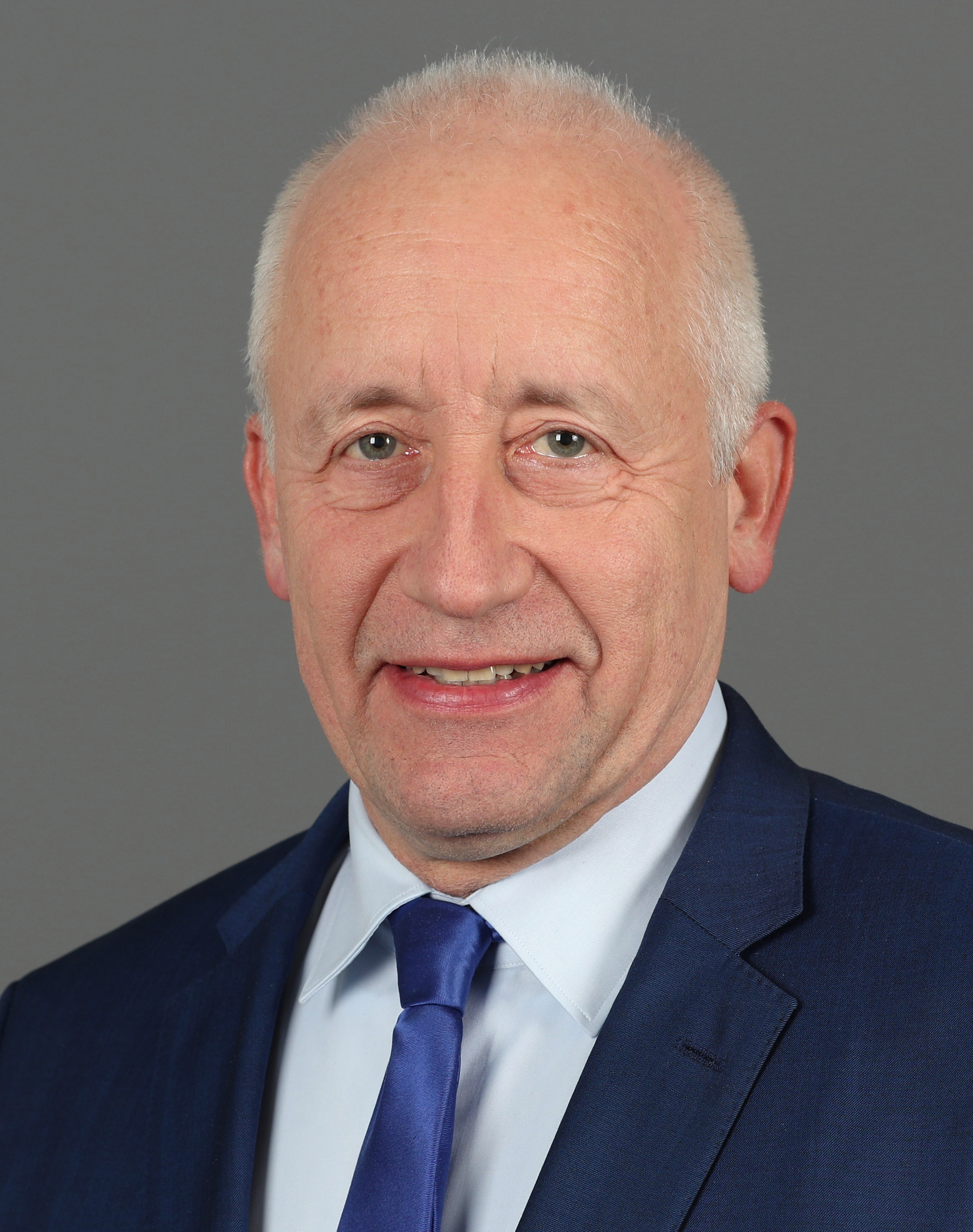
- Schinnenburg in 2020

Member of the Bundestag
- Incumbent
- Assumed office 2017

Personal details
- Born: 12 November 1958 (age 67) Norden, West Germany
- Party: Free Democratic Party
- Children: 3
- Education: Hannover Medical School; Westphalian Wilhelms University; University of Hamburg
- Occupation: Dentist and lawyer

Wieland Schinnenburg (born 12 November 1958) is a German politician of the Free Democratic Party (FDP) who has been serving as a member of the Bundestag from the state of Hamburg since 2017.

== Early life and career ==
Schinnenburg studied dentistry from 1978 to 1984 at Hannover Medical School and the Westphalian Wilhelms University in Münster. After his state examination, he received his doctorate in 1985.

From 1984 to 1987 Schinnenburg worked as an employed dentist. From 1987 until his election to the German Bundestag in 2017 he ran his own practice in Oststeinbek near Hamburg. In addition to his work as a dentist, he began studying law at the University of Hamburg in 1989, which he completed in 1994 with the First State Examination; in 1997, he took the Second State Examination at the Higher Regional Court of Celle. During his studies, he completed study visits and internships in Port-au-Prince, Los Angeles, Chiang Mei, Jerusalem and Washington, D.C.

In 1998, Schinnenburg opened a law firm in addition to his dental practice. Since 2006, he has been a specialist lawyer for medical law and since 2007 a mediator.

Since March 2023, Schinnenburg is moderating the interview magazine Veto on Massengeschmack-TV as the successor to Holger Kreymeier.

== Political career ==
Schinnenburg joined the FDP in 1981. He served as a member of the Hamburg State Parliament from 2001 to 2004 and from 2011 to 2017.

Schinnenburg became a member of the Bundestag in the 2017 German federal election, representing the Hamburg-Wandsbek district. In parliament, he has since been serving on the Committee on Health and, as an alternate, on the Committee on Legal Affairs. He is his parliamentary group's spokesman for drug and addiction policy.

In addition to his committee assignments, Schinnenburg serves as deputy chair of the German-Korean Parliamentary Group.
