= Lemsahl-Mellingstedt =

- Quarter of Hamburg
- Interactive map of Lemsahl-Mellingstedt
- Location within Germany Location within Hamburg
- Coordinates: 53°41′24″N 10°5′47″E
- Country: Germany
- State: Hamburg
- City: Hamburg
- Borough: Wandsbek

Area
  - Total: 7.9 km^{2} (3.1 sq mi)

Population (2024-12-31)
  - Total: 7,031
  - Density: 890/km^{2} (2,300/sq mi)
- Time zone: UTC+01:00 (CET)
  - Summer (DST): UTC+02:00 (CEST)
- Dialling codes: 040
- Vehicle registration: HH

Lemsahl-Mellingstedt (German pronunciation: [ˈlɛmzaːl ˈmɛlɪŋʃtɛt]) is a quarter of Hamburg, Germany, in the borough Wandsbek. The population was over 6900 in 2020.

== Geography ==
Lemsahl-Mellingstedt borders the quarters Duvenstedt, Wohldorf-Ohlstedt, Bergstedt, Poppenbüttel and Sasel. It also borders Norderstedt in Schleswig-Holstein. Lemsahl-Mellingstedt is located at the Alster river.

== Politics ==
These are the results of Lemsahl-Mellingstedt in the Hamburg state election in 2015:

- SPD 44.9%
- CDU 23.1%
- The Greens 9.2%
- FDP 12.0%
- AfD 5.9%
- The Left 3.2%
- Others 1.7%

Lemsahl-Mellingstedt belongs to the electoral district of Alstertal-Walddörfer.

== Society ==
- Minors: 18.5%
- Elderly: 20.3%
- Households with children: 26.4%
- Foreigners: 4.2%
- Unemployed: 1.8%

== Transportation ==
Lemsahl-Mellingstedt has no S-Bahn or U-Bahn station, but two bus lines to the S-Bahn station Poppenbüttel
