= Duvenstedt =

- Quarter of Hamburg
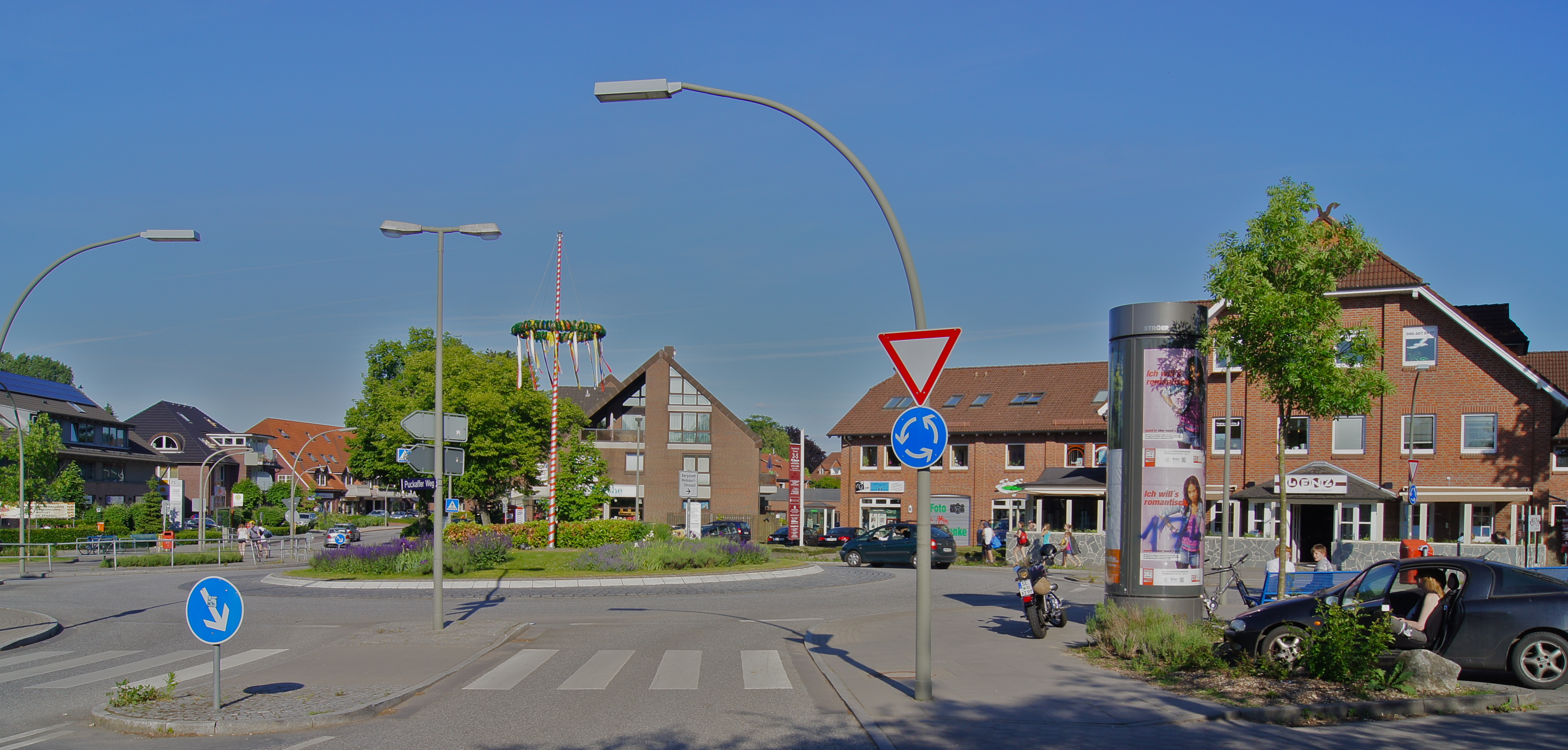
- Center of Duvenstedt

- Location of Duvenstedt in Hamburg
- Interactive map of Duvenstedt
- Location within Germany Location within Hamburg
- Coordinates: 53.708056°N 10.104444°E
- Country: Germany
- State: Hamburg
- City: Hamburg
- Borough: Hamburg-Wandsbek

Area
  - Total: 6.8 km^{2} (2.6 sq mi)

Population (2024-12-31)
  - Total: 5,940
  - Density: 870/km^{2} (2,300/sq mi)
- Time zone: UTC+01:00 (CET)
  - Summer (DST): UTC+02:00 (CEST)
- Dialling codes: 040
- Vehicle registration: HH

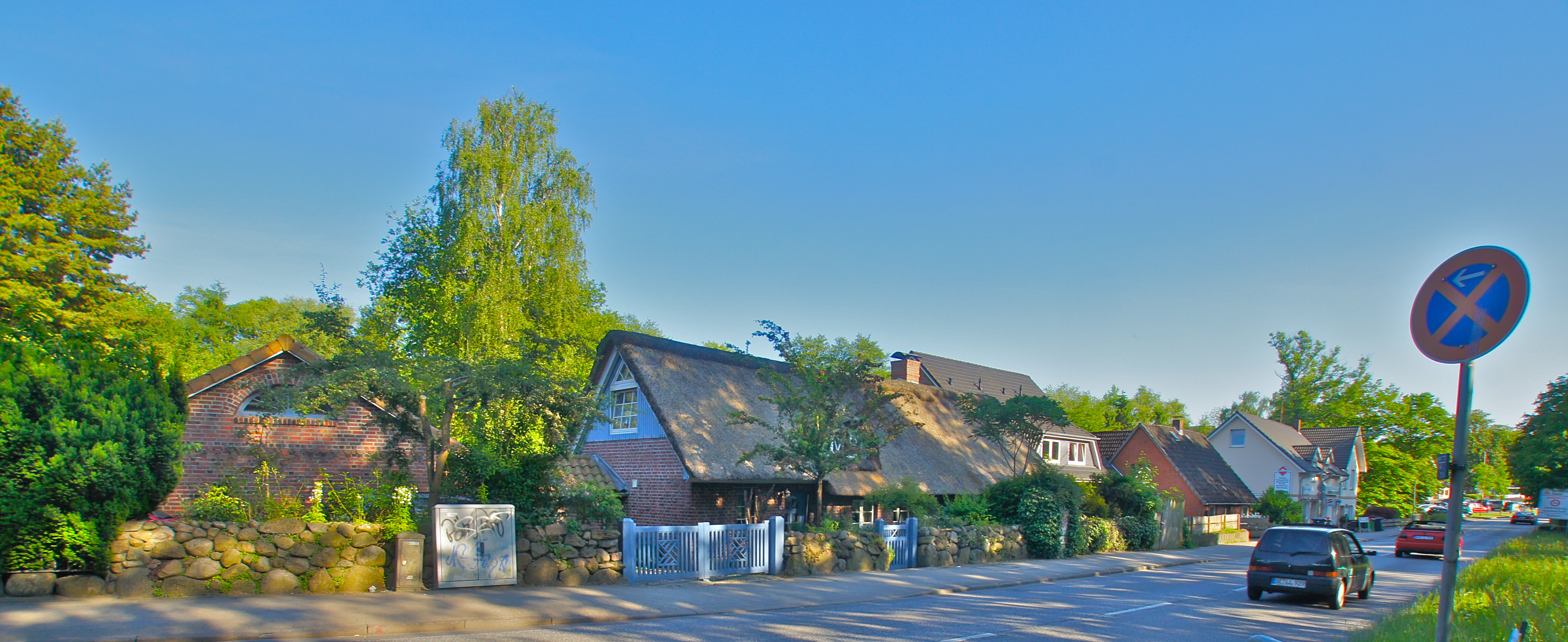
Thatched-roof house in Duvenstedt

Duvenstedt (German pronunciation: [ˈduːvn̩ˌʃtɛt]) is a quarter of Hamburg, Germany, in the borough of Wandsbek. It is located on the northern boundaries of the borough and of the city. It is part of the area of Walddörfer (lit. forest villages).

== Geography ==
Duvenstedt borders the quarters of Lemsahl-Mellingstedt and Wohldorf-Ohlstedt. The Alster river and the Diekbek stream flow through Duvenstedt. The nature reserve of Duvenstedter Brook is named after the former village, but is located in neighbouring Wohldorf-Ohlstedt.

== History ==
In 1261 Duvenstedt, formerly a Saxonian Rundling, was first recorded. It is named after a founder called Duvo. Also the part -stedt in the name refers to a Saxonian foundation, meaning safe settlement or safe residence. In 1937, the village was incorporated into Hamburg by the Greater Hamburg Act, which came into force in 1938.

== Politics ==
These are the results of Duvenstedt in the Hamburg state election:

	SPD	Greens	CDU	FDP	AfD	Left	Others
2020	39,1 %	23,5 %	17,3 %	8,3 %	4,8 %	3,2 %	3,8 %
2015	44,6 %	10,5 %	20,7 %	11,5 %	6,4 %	3,5 %	2,8 %
2011	44,2 %	10,8 %	28,8 %	9,8 %	–	2,9 %	3,5 %
2008	24,0 %	9,8 %	56,8 %	6,1 %	–	2,3 %	1,0 %
2004	21,2 %	11,7 %	59,9 %	4,0 %	–	–	3,2 %
2001	28,6 %	8,7 %	35,4 %	7,4 %	–	0,3 %	19,6 %
1997	27,4 %	11,4 %	41,7 %	5,3 %	–	0,2 %	14,0 %
1993	26,7 %	11,0 %	38,8 %	6,3 %	–	–	17,2 %
1991	31,3 %	6,8 %	50,4 %	9,2 %	–	0,1 %	2,2 %
1987	32,3 %	4,6 %	52,7 %	9,6 %	–	–	0,8 %
1986	30,6 %	8,1 %	52,3 %	8,4 %	–	–	0,6 %
Dec 1982	36,8 %	6,3 %	49,8 %	6,5 %	–	–	0,6 %
Jun 1982	30,4 %	7,3 %	55,4 %	5,8 %	–	–	1,1 %
1978	37,6 %	2,9 %	50,3 %	5,9 %	–	–	3,3 %
1974	32,9 %	–	51,7 %	13,2 %	–	–	2,2 %
1970	46,0 %	–	39,4 %	10,7 %	–	–	3,9 %
1966	47,9 %	–	37,2 %	9,5 %	–	–	5,4 %
