= Jürgen Klimke =

German politician

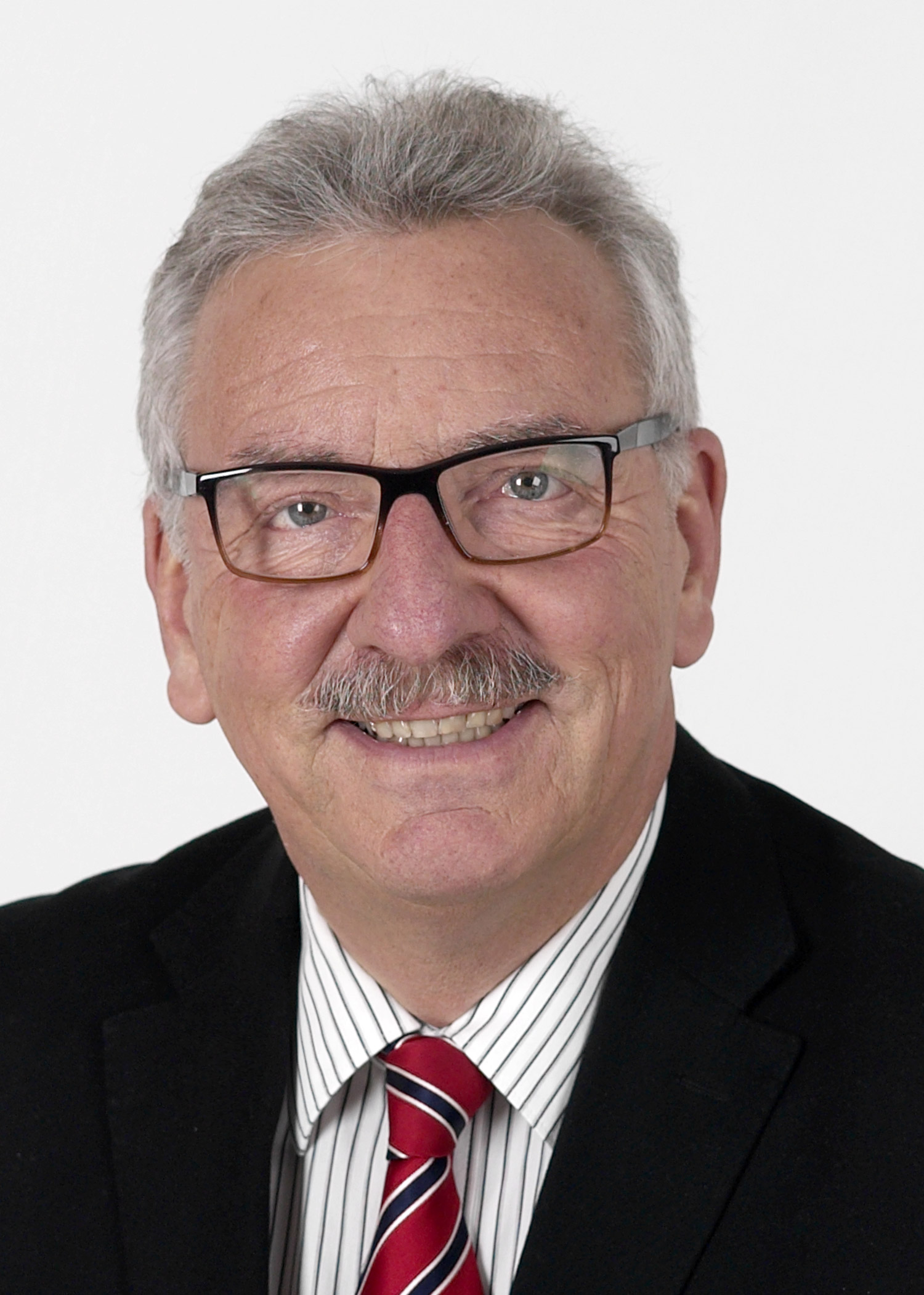
- Klimke in 2013

Member of the Bundestag; from Hamburg
- In office 17 October 2002 – 24 October 2017
- Constituency: State list (2002–2009); Hamburg-Wandsbek (2009–2013); State list (2013–2017)

Member of the Hamburg Parliament
- In office June 1982 – October 2002
- Constituency: State list

Personal details
- Born: 2 July 1948 (age 78) Hamburg, Germany
- Party: Christian Democratic Union
- Children: 4
- Education: University of Hamburg

Jürgen Klimke (born 2 July 1948) is a German politician and member of the conservative party CDU. From 1982 to 2002 he was member of the Parliament of the Free and Federal State of Hamburg (German: Hamburgische Bürgerschaft). Between 2002 and 2017, he represented Hamburg in the German Federal Parliament (the Bundestag).

== Life and career ==
After studying law at the University of Hamburg Klimke worked as a journalist. In addition to his parliamentary activities, he was CEO and is co-owner of the Public relations firm Industrie-Contact AG in Hamburg.

== Political career ==
Klimke joined the CDU in 1970. From 1982 to 2003 he was deputy district party chairman and from 2003 to 2008 party chairman in the district Hamburg-Wandsbek. Between 2004 and 2008 he worked as deputy regional party chairman in Hamburg.

=== Member of the Hamburg Parliament (1982–2002) ===
Between 1974 and 1982 Klimke was member of the district assembly in Hamburg-Wandsbek. From 1982 to 2002 he represented Wandsbek in the Hamburg Parliament where he served as Parliamentary Manager of the CDU parliamentary group (1985–2002).

=== Member of the Federal Parliament (2002–2017) ===
From the 2002 elections, Klimke served as a member of the German Federal Parliament (Bundestag). From 2005 to 2009, he was spokesperson of the CDU/CSU group in the Committee on Tourism, from 2009 he was the group's spokesperson in the Committee on Economic Cooperation and Development.

Klimke's regional focus lies in South and Southeast Asia. During the current legislative period, Klimke is member of the Committee on Foreign Affairs and spokesperson of the CDU/CSU group in the Subcommittee for the United Nations, International Organizations and Globalization. Furthermore, Klimke is chairman of the working group on the River Elbe of the CDU/CSU group and deputy chair of the German delegation to the Parliamentary Assembly of the OSCE.

In August 2015, Klimke was appointed as the first Special Representative of the Parliamentary Assembly of the Organization for Security and Co-operation in Europe for the Baltic Sea Area.

In addition to his parliamentary work, Klimke holds a number of honorary positions, including the following:

- United Nations Association of Germany, Deputy Chairman
- German Institute for Development Evaluation (DEval), Deputy Chairman of the Executive Board
- Euro-Mediterranean-Arab Association, Member of the Executive Board
- Youth For Understanding Germany, Member of the Board of Trustees

In September 2016, Klimke announced that he would not stand in the 2017 federal elections but instead resign from active politics by the end of the parliamentary term.

- In the summer of 2012, Klimke and 12 other members of the CDU/CSU group advocated publicly for equal taxation of registered same-sex partnerships.
- As rapporteur for cultural relations and education policy in the Committee on Foreign Affairs, Klimke, amongst other things, advocates for international youth exchange. On 18 June 2015, the motion for resolution “Internationalen Jugend- und Schüleraustausch als Fundament in der Auswärtigen Kultur- und Bildungspolitik verankern”, initiated by Klimke, was passed in the German Bundestag.
- As a member of the German delegation to the Parliamentary Assembly of the OSCE, Klimke advocates for strengthening the overall role of the OSCE and furthering German commitment to the institution. Against the background of the Ukraine-crisis, Klimke repeatedly emphasized that the strength of the OSCE is the inclusion of countries like Russia and the United States of America in its membership, allowing for discussions with and not only about them.

== Personal life ==
Klimke is Protestant, married and has four children.
