= Wohldorf-Ohlstedt =

- Quarter of Hamburg
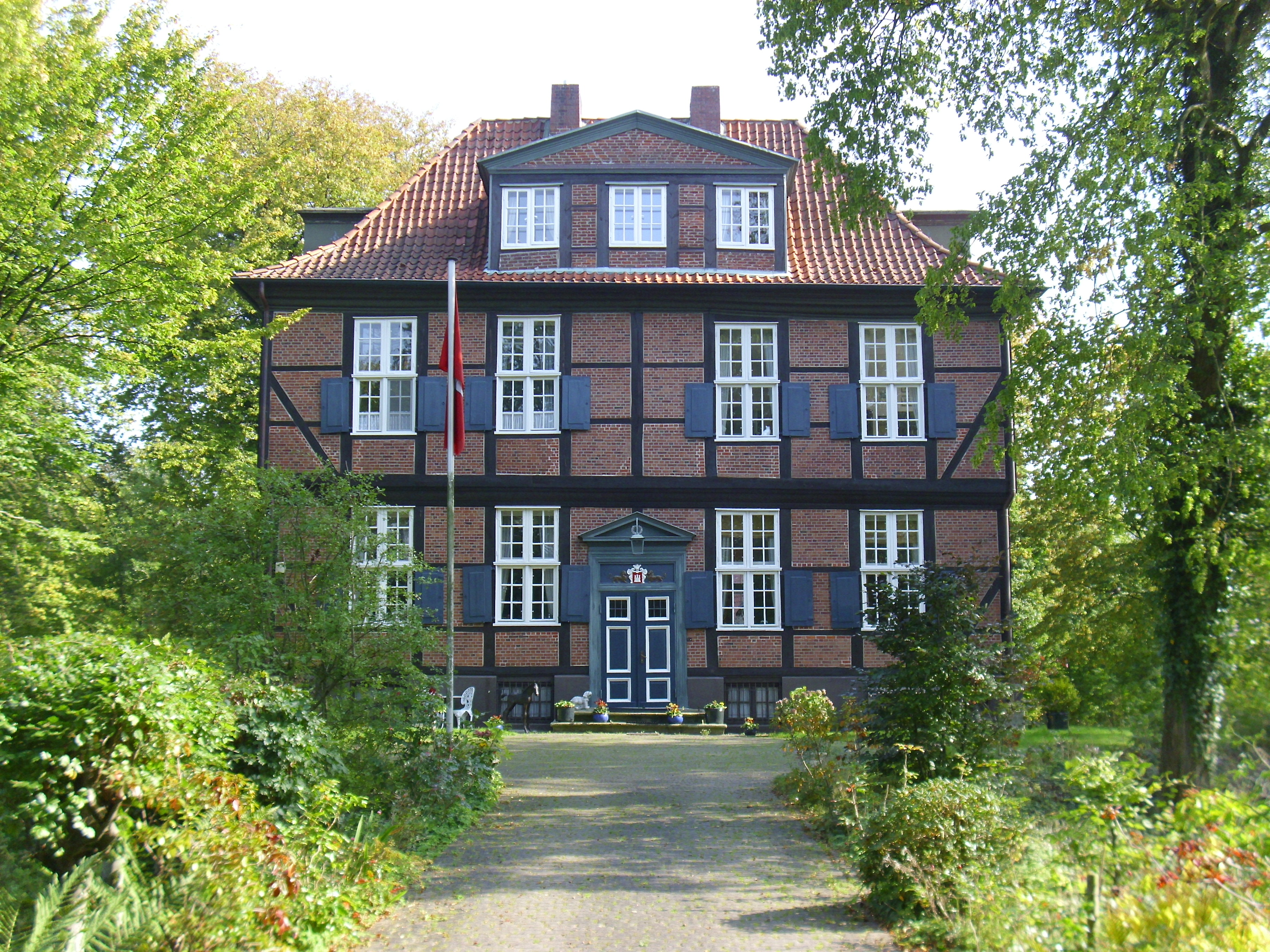
- Interactive map of Wohldorf-Ohlstedt
- Location within Germany Location within Hamburg
- Coordinates: 53°41′34″N 10°7′52″E
- Country: Germany
- State: Hamburg
- City: Hamburg
- Borough: Wandsbek

Area
  - Total: 17.3 km^{2} (6.7 sq mi)

Population (2024-12-31)
  - Total: 4,839
  - Density: 280/km^{2} (724/sq mi)
- Time zone: UTC+01:00 (CET)
  - Summer (DST): UTC+02:00 (CEST)
- Dialling codes: 040
- Vehicle registration: HH

Wohldorf-Ohlstedt (German pronunciation) is a neighborhood of Hamburg, Germany, in the borough Wandsbek. It is the most northern quarter and one of the wealthiest in Hamburg.

== Geography ==
Wohldorf-Ohlstedt borders the quarters Duvenstedt, Lemsahl-Mellingstedt and Bergstedt. Outside Hamburg it borders the Kreise Tangstedt, Jersbek and Ammersbek in Schleswig-Holstein.

== Politics ==
These are the results of Wohldorf-Ohlstedt in the Hamburg state election:

State Election	SPD	CDU	Greens	FDP	AfD	Left	Others
2020	32.5 %	17.5 %	25.8 %	10.8 %	3,5 %	4.0 %	3.0 %
2015	38.5 %	20.8 %	14.9 %	14.4 %	4.7 %	4.1 %	2,5 %

Wohldorf-Ohlstedt belongs to the electoral district of Alstertal-Walddörfer.

== Transport ==
Wohlstedt-Ohlstedt has access to one U-Bahn station.
