= Tonndorf, Hamburg =

Administrative division in Hamburg, Germany

Tonndorf
- Quarter of Hamburg
- Location of Tonndorf within Hamburg
- Interactive map of Tonndorf
- Location within Germany Location within Hamburg
- Coordinates: 53°35′10″N 10°07′29″E
- Country: Germany
- State: Hamburg
- City: Hamburg
- Borough: Wandsbek

Population (2024-12-31)
  - Total: 15,580
- Time zone: UTC+01:00 (CET)
  - Summer (DST): UTC+02:00 (CEST)

Tonndorf (German pronunciation: [ˈtɔndɔʁf]) is a quarter of Hamburg, Germany in the Wandsbek borough. It is home to Studio Hamburg, one of the leading media production companies in Germany.
