= Sasel =

Quarter in Hamburg, Germany

- Quarter of Hamburg
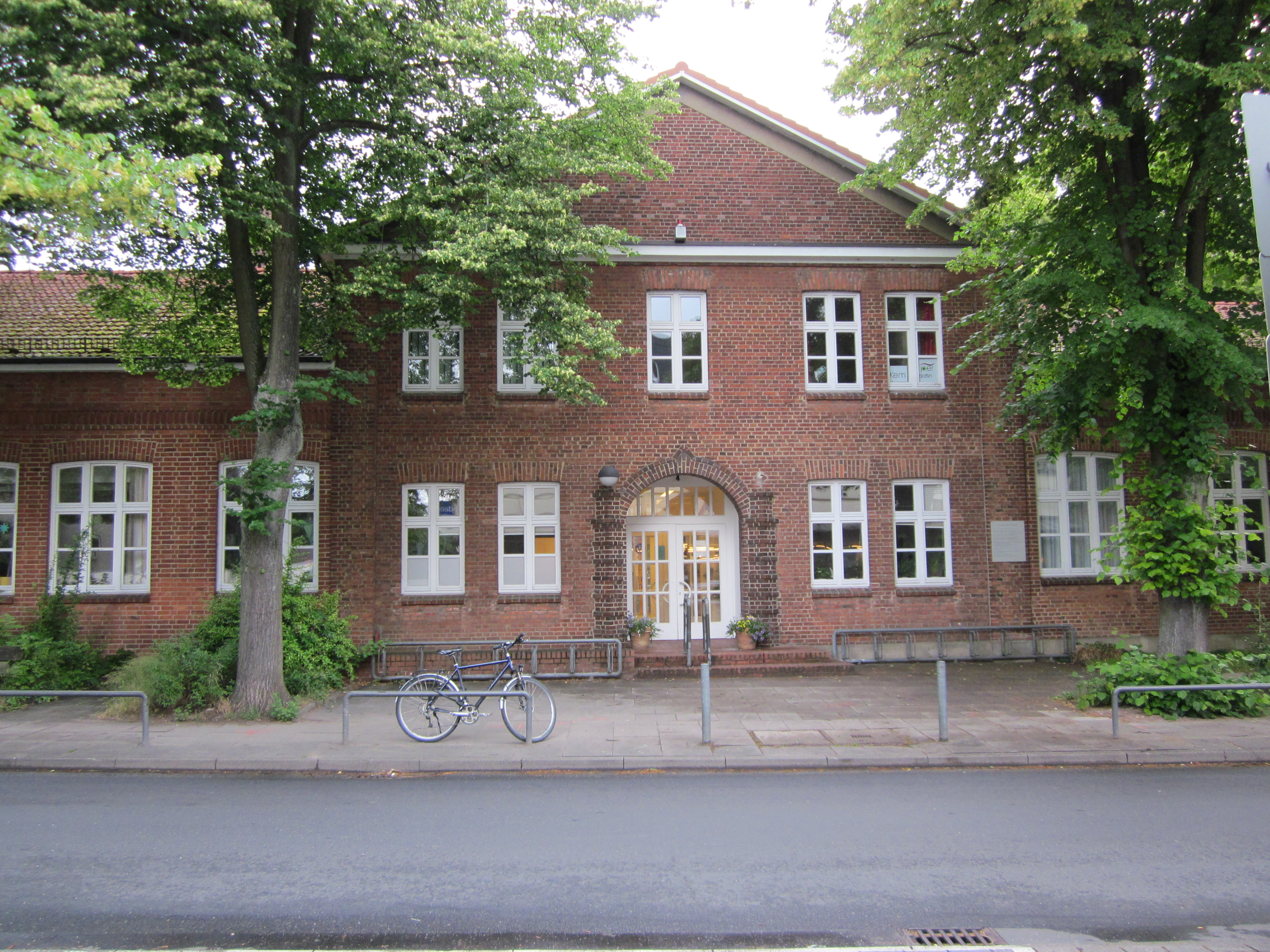

- Location of Sasel within Hamburg
- Interactive map of Sasel
- Location within Germany Location within Hamburg
- Coordinates: 53°39′14″N 10°06′43″E
- Country: Germany
- State: Hamburg
- City: Hamburg
- Borough: Wandsbek

Population (2024-12-31)
  - Total: 24,287
- Time zone: UTC+01:00 (CET)
  - Summer (DST): UTC+02:00 (CEST)

Sasel (German pronunciation: [ˈzaːzl̩]) is a quarter of Hamburg, Germany in the Wandsbek borough. The current population is 24,316 (31 Dec. 2023).

Sasel has good infrastructure. It has three schools and a center which accumulates several supermarkets and stores around the market.
