= Franziska Hoppermann =

German politician and Bundestag (parliament) member

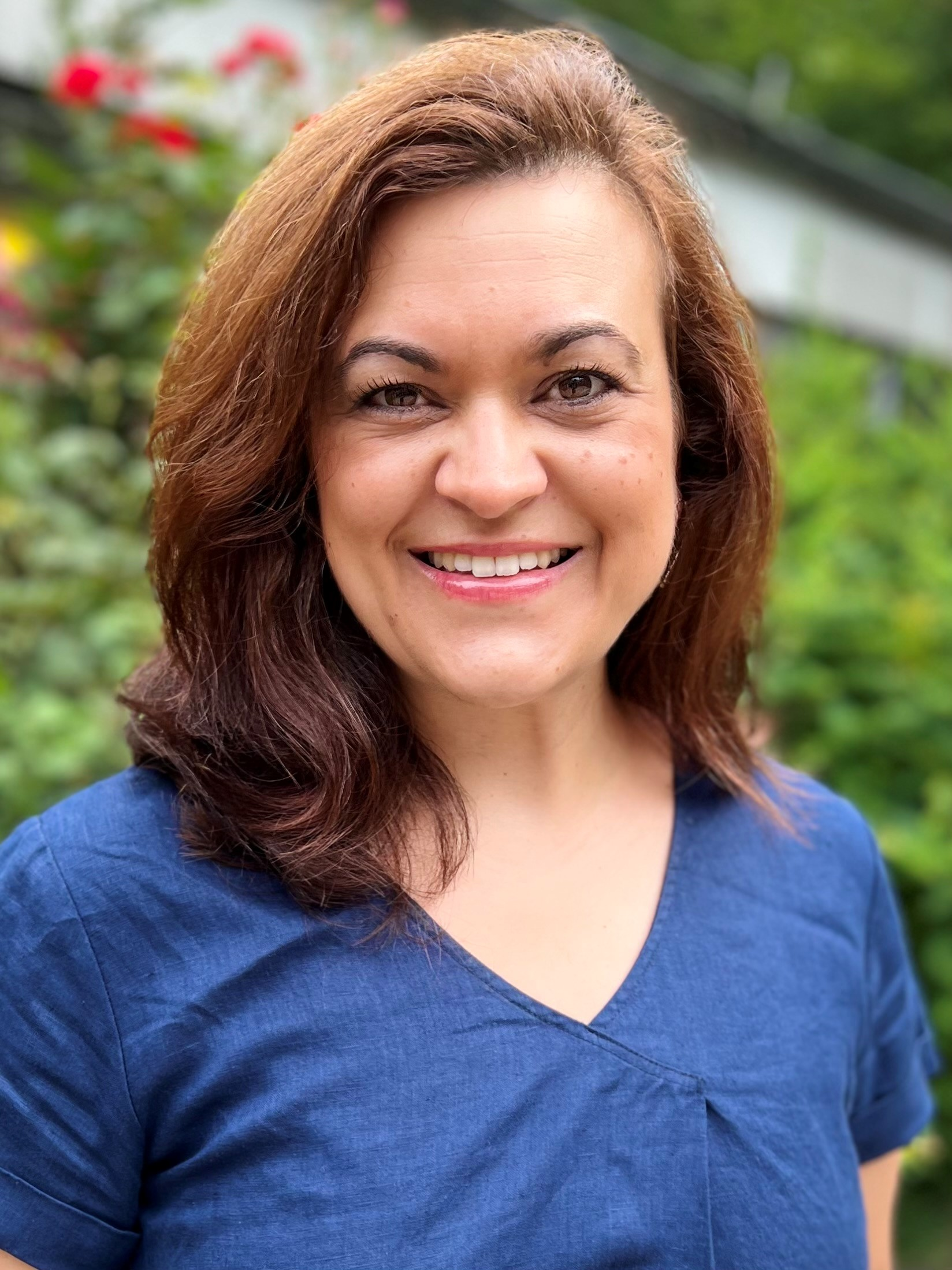
- Hoppermann in 2022

General Secretary of the Christian Democratic Union
- Acting
- Assumed office 27 July 2026
- Preceded by: Carsten Linnemann

Member of the Bundestag for Hamburg
- Incumbent
- Assumed office 26 October 2021

Personal details
- Born: 8 January 1982 (age 44) Hamburg, West Germany (now Germany)
- Party: CDU

Franziska Christina Brigitte Hoppermann (née Bartels, born 8 January 1982) is a German civil servant and politician of the Christian Democratic Union (CDU) who has been serving as a member of the Bundestag since the 2021 elections, representing the Hamburg-Wandsbek district. She became the General Secretary of her party in July 2026.

== Political career ==
=== Career in state politics ===
Ahead of the 2020 state elections, CDU candidate Marcus Weinberg included Hoppermann in his shadow cabinet for the party's campaign to unseat First Mayor of Hamburg Peter Tschentscher.

=== Member of the German Parliament, 2021–present ===
Hoppermann became a member of the German Bundestag in the 2021 national elections, representing the Hamburg-Wandsbek district.

In parliament, Hoppermann has since been serving on the Committee on Digital Affairs and the Budget Committee's Subcommittee on European Affairs. Following the 2025 elections, she also joined the Budget Committee, where she has been serving as her parliamentary group's rapporteur on the annual budget of the Federal Ministry for Digital Transformation and Government Modernisation. Since 2025, she has been chairing a parliamentary inquiry looking into the policy decisions made to contain the COVID-19 pandemic in Germany.

Ahead of the Christian Democrats' leadership election in 2022, Hoppermann publicly endorsed Norbert Röttgen to succeed Armin Laschet as the party's chair and joined his campaign team.

In the negotiations to form a Grand Coalition under the leadership of Friedrich Merz's Christian Democrats (CDU together with the Bavarian CSU) and the Social Democrats (SPD) following the 2025 German elections, Hoppermann was part of the CDU/CSU delegation in the working group on government reform and cutting red tape, chaired by Philipp Amthor, Daniela Ludwig and Sonja Eichwede.

After the resignation of Jens Spahn, in July 2026, as Leader of the Parliamentary group CDU/CSU in the Bundestag and the cabinet reshuffle, she was elected unopposed as the new Secretary General of the CDU succeeding Carsten Linnemann who will be the new Federal Minister for Health.

== Personal life ==
Hoppermann is married and has a son. Her grandfather Carl Damm sat in the Hamburg Parliament and was also a Member of the Bundestag.
