= Marienthal, Hamburg =

Quarter in Hamburg, Germany

Marienthal
- Quarter of Hamburg
- Location of Marienthal within Hamburg
- Interactive map of Marienthal
- Location within Germany Location within Hamburg
- Coordinates: 53°34′08″N 10°05′09″E
- Country: Germany
- State: Hamburg
- City: Hamburg
- Borough: Wandsbek

Population (2024-12-31)
  - Total: 13,779
- Time zone: UTC+01:00 (CET)
  - Summer (DST): UTC+02:00 (CEST)

Marienthal (German pronunciation: [maˈʁiːənˌtaːl]) is a quarter of Hamburg, Germany in the Wandsbek borough.
