= Eilbek =

- Quarter of Hamburg
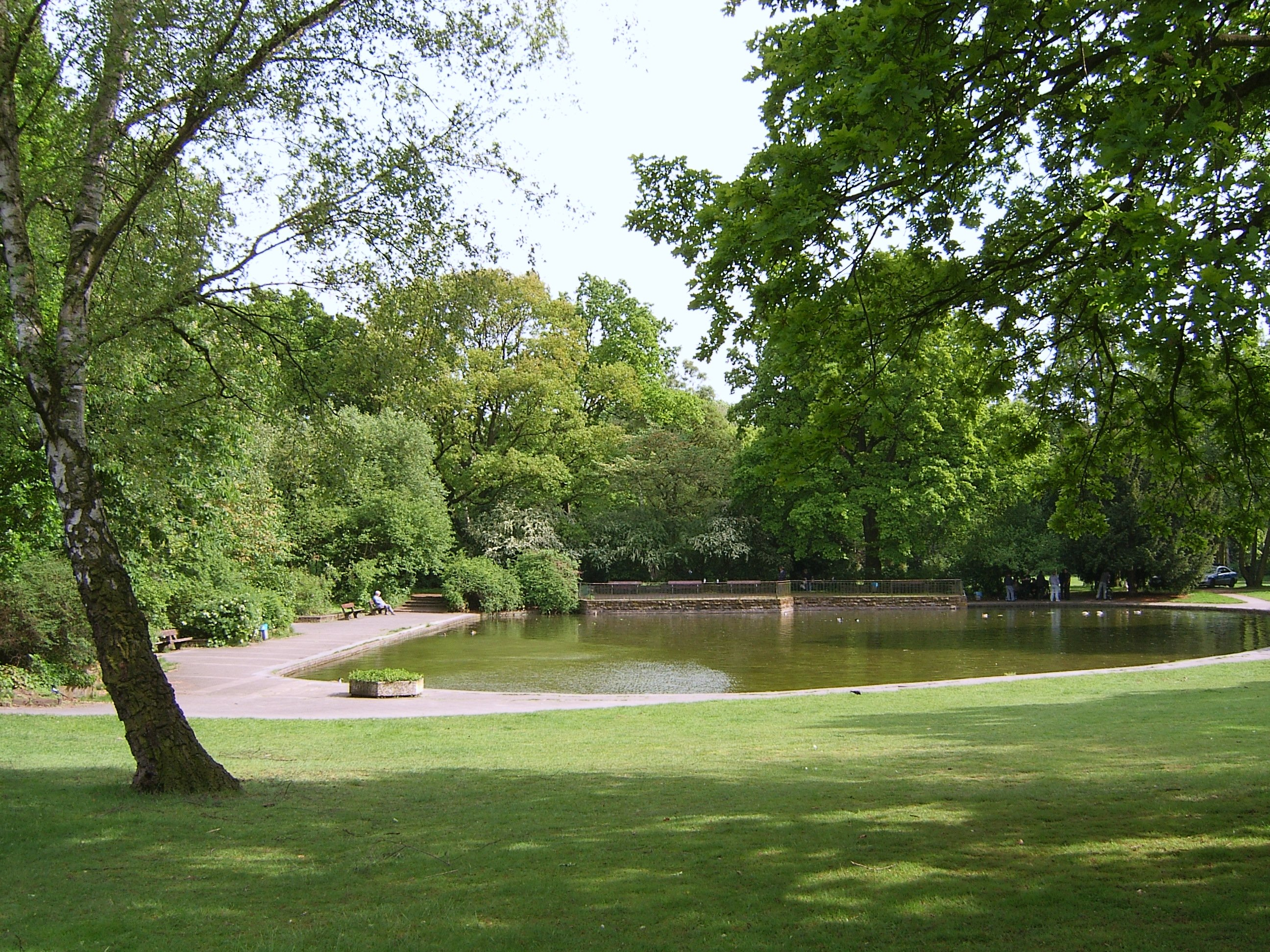
- Jacobipark recreation area

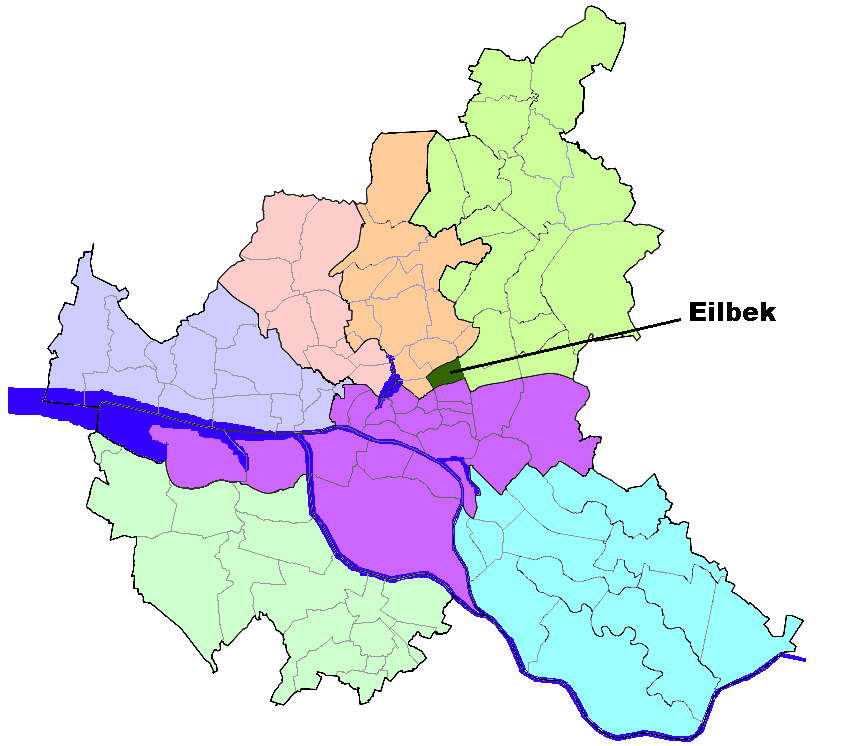
- Location of Eilbek quarter of Hamburg
- Interactive map of Eilbek
- Location within Germany Location within Hamburg
- Coordinates: 53°34′4″N 10°2′44″E
- Country: Germany
- State: Hamburg
- City: Hamburg
- Borough: Wandsbek

Area
  - Total: 1.7 km^{2} (0.66 sq mi)

Population (2024-12-31)
  - Total: 22,694
  - Density: 13,000/km^{2} (35,000/sq mi)
- Time zone: UTC+01:00 (CET)
  - Summer (DST): UTC+02:00 (CEST)
- Dialling codes: 040
- Vehicle registration: HH

Eilbek (German pronunciation: [ˈaɪlbeːk]; former Eilbeck) is a quarter of the German city of Hamburg and part of the Wandsbek borough. It originated as a small village on the outskirts of Hamburg and was eventually incorporated when the city expanded. In 2020 the population was 22,235.

== Etymology ==
The village was named after the small Wandse river, here named Eilbek. This is usually regarded as derived from the old German for "rushing stream", eile meaning to hurry or rush and Beck meaning river or stream. However other sources interpret the first element, Ylen or Ilen, as leech (German Egel), because in northern Germany the language is Low German.

== History ==
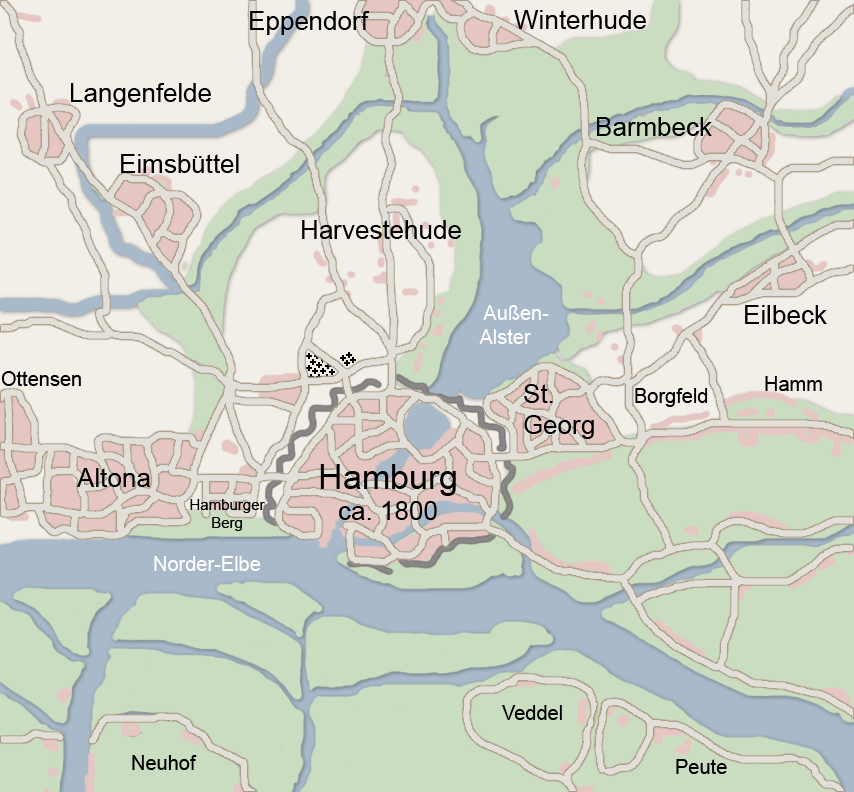
Hamburg 1800

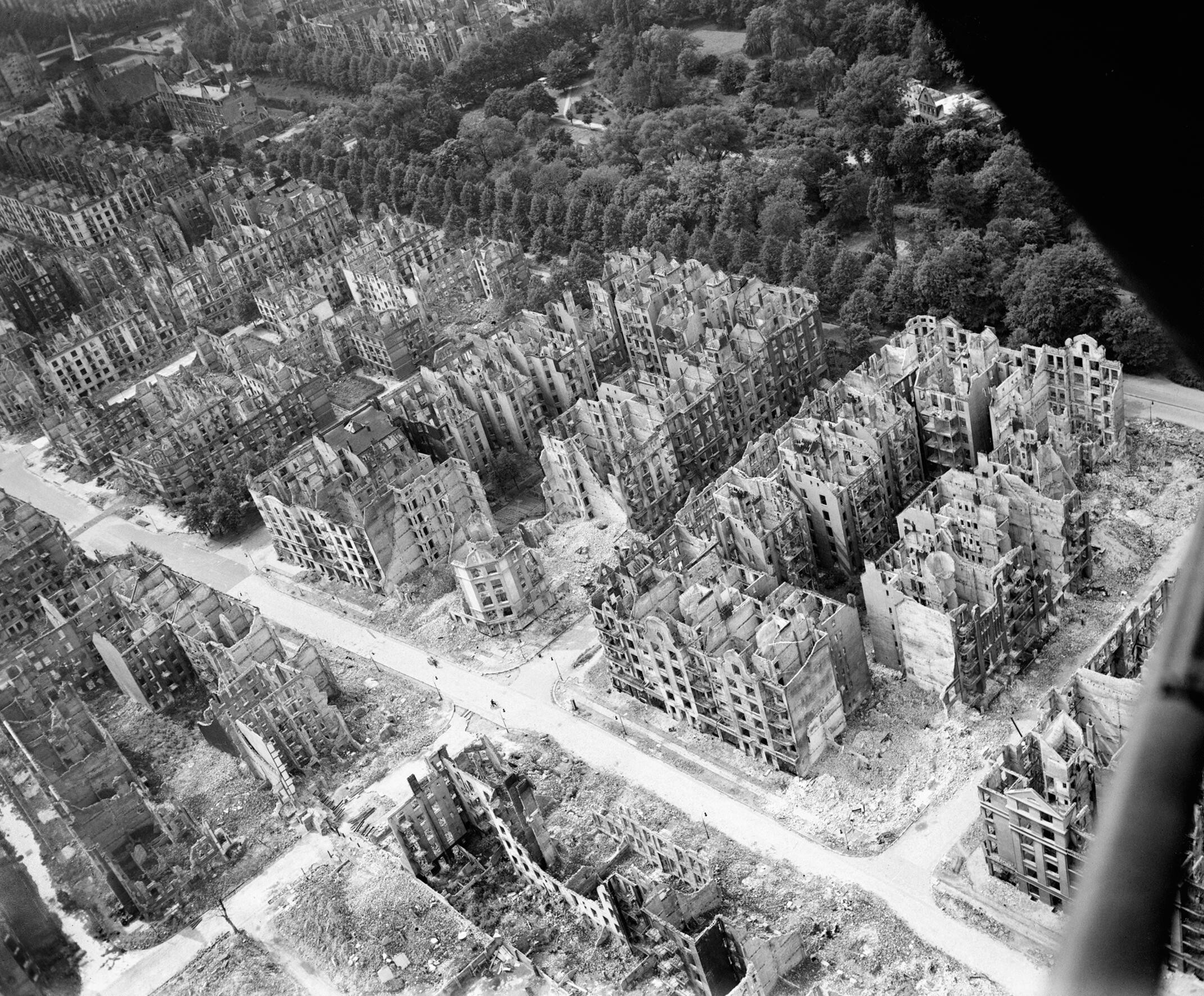
Eilbek after the bombing of Hamburg in World War II

Eilbek first appears in 1247 as Ylenbeke.

During the Great Fire of Hamburg from May 5 to May 8, 1842, the center of Hamburg was destroyed. Some of the people from Hamburg-Altstadt settled in Ylenbeke.

In the Second World War Eilbek was almost completely destroyed by the heavy air raids in July 1943 (codenamed Operation Gomorrah). With the reorganization of Hamburg in 1949 Eilbek became a part of Wandsbek.

== Geography ==
In 2006 according to the statistical office of Hamburg and Schleswig-Holstein, the quarter Eilbek has a total area of 1.7 km^{2} (1 sq mi). To the north and the west the quarters Barmbek-Süd, Uhlenhorst and Hohenfelde of the borough Hamburg-Nord border on Eilbek. The eastern borders are with the quarters Wandsbek and Marienthal. In the south is the quarter Hamm-Nord of the Hamburg-Mitte borough.

== Demographics ==
In 2006 the population of the quarter of Eilbek was 20,265. The population density was 11,741/km^{2} (30,409/sq mi). 9.8% were children under the age of 18, and 21.4% were 65 years of age or older. 14.7% were resident aliens. 1,087 people were registered as unemployed. In 1999 there were 12,659 households and 58.7% of all households were made up of individuals.

There were 3 elementary schools and 1 secondary school in the quarter Eilbek and 38 physicians in private practice and 5 pharmacies.

== Politics ==
These are the results of Eilbek in the Hamburg state election:

	SPD	Greens	Left	CDU	AfD	FDP	Others
2020	36,2 %	30,1 %	10,0 %	7,5 %	5,0 %	4,2 %	7,0 %
2015	47,4 %	13,9 %	8,9 %	11,4 %	6,2 %	6,2 %	5,9 %
2011	50,9 %	11,8 %	6,6 %	18,2 %	–	5,8 %	5,1 %
2008	35,5 %	9,6 %	6,6 %	40,8 %	–	4,6 %	2,8 %
2004	32,5 %	11,5 %	–	46,0 %	–	3,1 %	7,0 %
2001	39,5 %	8,2 %	0,5 %	26,5 %	–	4,5 %	20,8 %
1997	38,2 %	13,3 %	0,7 %	30,2 %	–	3,2 %	14,4 %
1993	43,1 %	12,4 %	–	25,5 %	–	3,4 %	15,6 %

== Transportation ==
The Bundesstraße 75 leads through the quarter, connecting the city Lübeck in the North with Delmenhorst in Lower Saxony. According to the Department of Motor Vehicles (Kraftfahrt-Bundesamt), 6,560 private cars were registered (328 cars/1000 people) in Eilbek.
