= Wandsbek (quarter) =

- Quarter of Hamburg
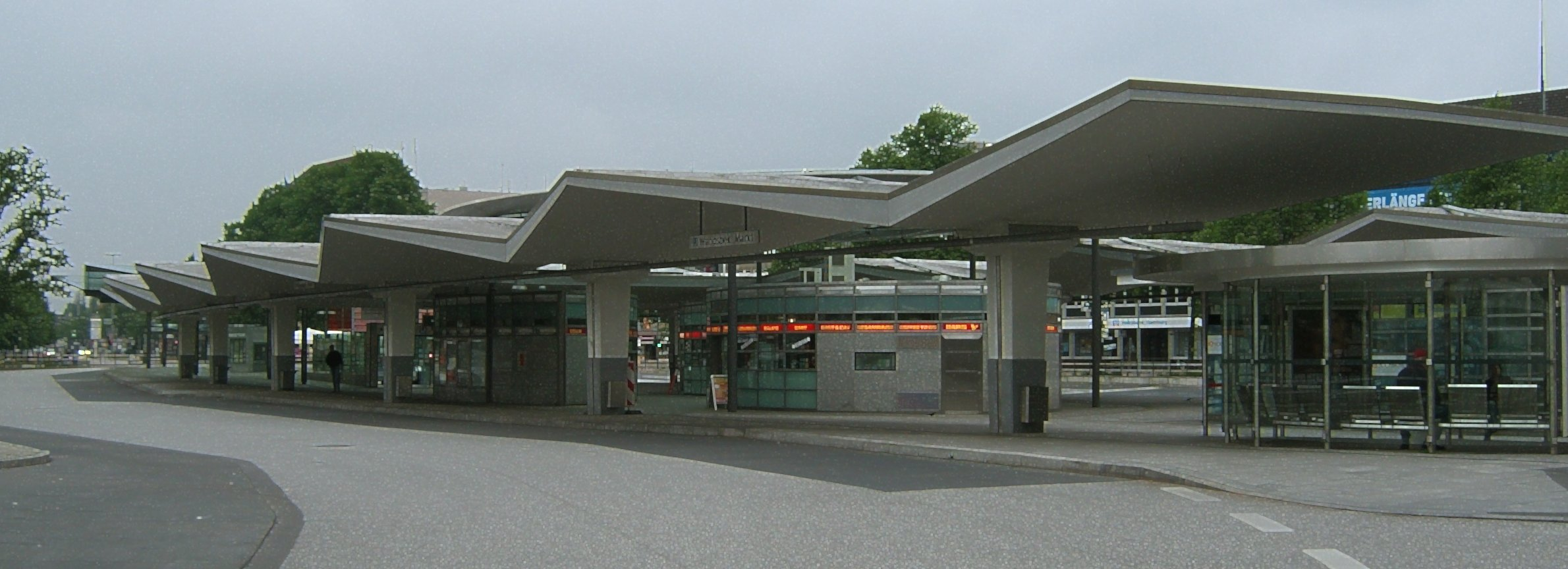
- Bus station Wandsbek market place

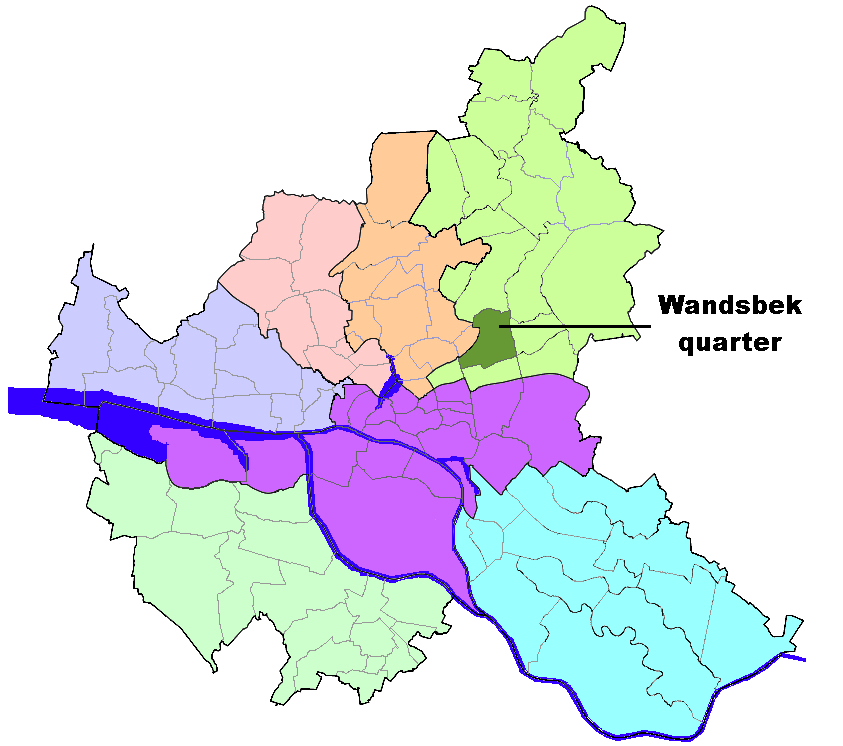
- Location of the quarter Wandsbek
- Interactive map of Wandsbek
- Location within Germany Location within Hamburg
- Coordinates: 53°34′0″N 10°5′0″E
- Country: Germany
- State: Hamburg
- City: Hamburg
- Borough: Wandsbek
- Founded: 13th century

Area
  - Total: 6 km^{2} (2.3 sq mi)

Population (2024-12-31)
  - Total: 38,397
  - Density: 6,400/km^{2} (17,000/sq mi)
- Time zone: UTC+01:00 (CET)
  - Summer (DST): UTC+02:00 (CEST)
- Dialling codes: 040
- Vehicle registration: HH

Wandsbek (German pronunciation: [ˈvantsbeːk]) is an urban quarter in the Wandsbek borough of Hamburg, Germany, and the former city Wandsbek in the Duchy of Holstein. In 2020 the population was 36,671. It was also the birthplace of Großadmiral Erich Raeder.

== History ==
Wandsbek was once part of the county Stormarn. Its villages were first mentioned in the middle of the 13th century. The name Wandsbek, Wandsbeck or (older) Wantesbeke derives from old Low Saxon ("Low German") for "border river" and the river Wandse was a natural territorial border.

An old Danish phrase for stating that something is a fraud / unreliable is to claim that "det gælder ad Wandsbek[/Vandsbæk] til" (i.e. "this is valid in Wandsbeck."). Wandsbek was one of the three locations in the Danish monarchy where the first lottery drew its numbers, and this expression dates from the early years of this lottery's life where a number of people tried to claim prizes in Copenhagen with tickets from Wandsbeck. Since each of the three towns drew its own set of numbers, a ticket from one town was worthless in the two others.

Until 1864 Wandsbek was a part of the Duchy of Holstein and under the rule of the King of Denmark. Afterwards, it became part of the Prussian province Schleswig-Holstein.

In 1937 the still Prussian city of Wandsbek joined the city of Hamburg through the Greater Hamburg Act.

== Geography ==
The quarter of Wandsbek has an area of 6 km^{2}. The western border is to the quarter Dulsberg in the borough Hamburg-Nord. The northern border to Bramfeld is the small river Osterbek. In the east are the quarters Farmsen-Berne and Tonndorf. The southern border to the quarter Marienthal is mostly the railway tracks of the city train.

== Demographics ==
In 2006, 32,350 people were living in the quarter of Wandsbek. The population density was 5,397 people per km^{2}. 11.7% were children under the age of 18, and 21.9% were 65 years of age or older. 14.5% were immigrants. 1,754 people were registered as unemployed. In 1999 there were 19,083 households, out of which 14.4% had children under the age of 18 living with them and 54.1% of all households were made up of individuals. The average household size was 1.72.

In 2006 there were 5,306 criminal offences in the quarter (164 crimes per 1000 people).

According to the Department of Motor Vehicles (Kraftfahrt-Bundesamt), in the quarter of Wandsbek 11,771 private cars were registered (365 cars/1000 people).

There are 5 elementary schools and 3 secondary schools in the quarter of Wandsbek.

== Infrastructure ==
=== Health systems ===
Founded in 1937 as a military hospital for the German Wehrmacht, the military hospital of the Bundeswehr (Bundeswehrkrankenhaus Hamburg) with 305 beds in 13 departments is a general hospital and teaching hospital for the University of Hamburg. The hospital has the capacity to dispatch emergency medical services. An emergency ambulance with a physician and a rescue helicopter are stationed at the hospital. It is located at Lesserstr. 180.

Some 52 physicians in private practice and 9 pharmacies were counted in 2006.

== Wandsbek in literature ==
From 1771 to 1775, the German poet Matthias Claudius edited the highly reputed literary journal Wandsbecker Bote in Wandsbek.
