= Wandsbek =

- Borough of Hamburg
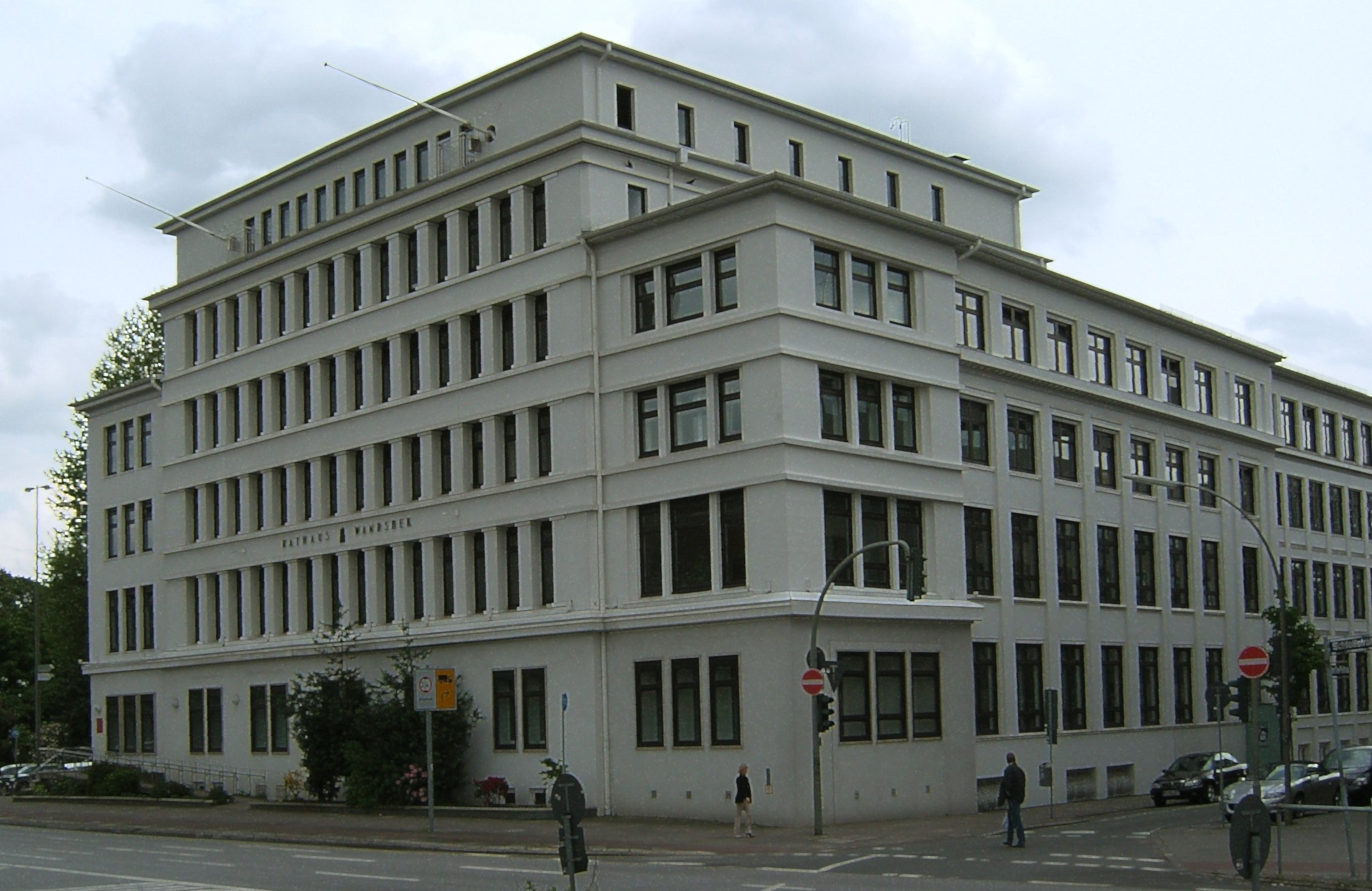
- Stormarnhaus in Wandsbek; Local office of the borough

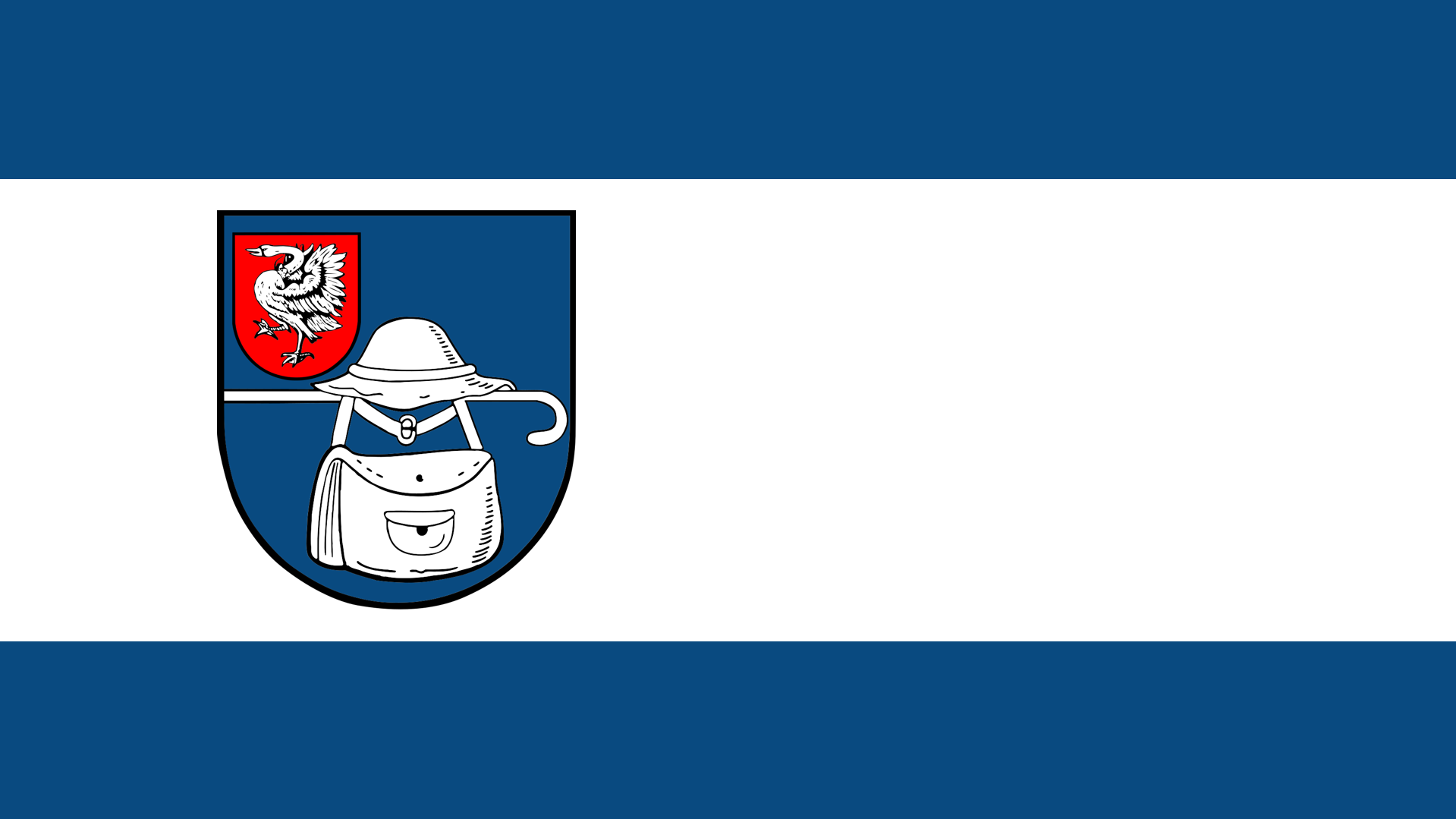
- Flag Coat of arms

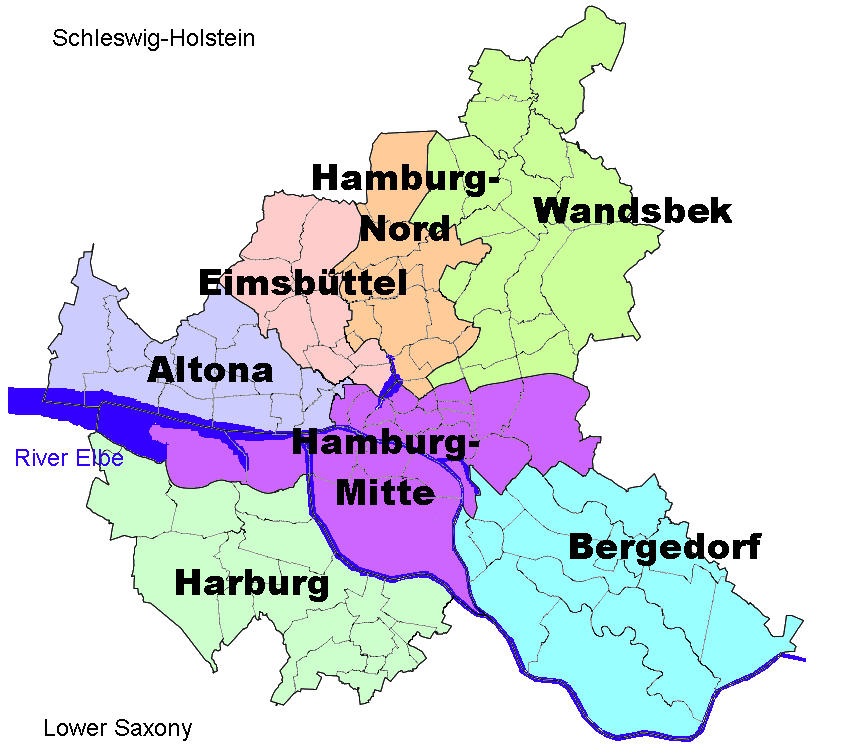
- Boroughs of Hamburg
- Interactive map of Wandsbek
- Location within Germany Location within Hamburg
- Coordinates: 53°35′N 10°5′E
- Country: Germany
- State: Hamburg
- City: Hamburg
- Subdivisions: 18 quarters

Area
  - Total: 147.5 km^{2} (57.0 sq mi)

Population (2024-12-31)
  - Total: 456,412
  - Density: 3,094/km^{2} (8,014/sq mi)
- Time zone: UTC+01:00 (CET)
  - Summer (DST): UTC+02:00 (CEST)
- Dialling codes: 040
- Vehicle registration: HH

Wandsbek (German pronunciation: [ˈvantsbeːk]) is the second-largest of seven boroughs that make up the city and state of Hamburg, Germany. The name of the district is derived from the river Wandse which passes through here. Wandsbek, which was formerly an independent city, is urban and, along with Eilbek and Marienthal, part of the city's economic and cultural core. In 2020 the population was 442,702, making it the most populous borough in Hamburg.

== History ==
Wandsbek was the place of residence of the poet Johann Heinrich Voss and of Matthias Claudius, who here issued (1771–1775) the newspaper Der Wandsbecker Bote (The Wandsbeck Messenger). There is a monument to Claudius in the town.

During World War II from May 2, 1944 until May 3, 1945 a subcamp of the Nazi concentration camp of Neuengamme was located in Wandsbek, listed as no. 565 Hamburg-Wandsbek in the official German list.

On January 1, 2007 the Ortsämter (Precincts) were dissolved and the organisation of all boroughs of Hamburg was restructured. In the borough Wandsbek to the former precinct Wandsbek had belonged the quarters Eilbek, Jenfeld, Marienthal, Tonndorf, Wandsbek and Rahlstedt. The quarters Hummelsbüttel, Poppenbüttel, Sasel and Wellingsbüttel belonged to the precinct Alstertal. The precinct Bramfeld consisted of Bramfeld and Steilshoop. The precinct Rahlstedt were the quarter Rahlstedt. And the precinct Walddörfer were Bergstedt, Duvenstedt, Farmsen-Berne, Lemsahl-Mellingstedt, Volksdorf and Wohldorf-Ohlstedt.

== Geography ==
In 2006 according to the statistical office of Hamburg and Schleswig-Holstein, the borough Wandsbek had a total area of 147.5 km^{2} (57 sq mi). In the north and the east it borders the state of Schleswig-Holstein, in the south the Hamburg-Mitte borough and in the west Hamburg-Nord borough mostly. Only three quarters, Eilbek, Wandsbek, and Marienthal, in the core of the borough are urban. The more northerly parts of Wohldorf-Ohlstedt, Volksdorf, Duvenstedt are still quite rural, where one can find a mix of newer residences and farms.

=== Administrative divisions ===
Subdivisions of Wandsbek

Like the other boroughs of Hamburg, Wandsbek is divided into quarters. They are:

Quarter	km^{2}	Residents (2014)	Quarter	km^{2}	Residents (2014)
Bergstedt	7,1	10.216	Bramfeld	10,1	50.838
Duvenstedt	6,8	6.253	Eilbek	1,7	20.981
Farmsen-Berne	8,3	34.664	Hummelsbüttel	9,2	17.180
Jenfeld	5,0	24.751	Lemsahl-Mellingstedt	7,9	6.556
Marienthal	3,3	12.358	Poppenbüttel	8,1	22.536
Rahlstedt	26,6	88.094	Sasel	8,4	23.366
Steilshoop	2,5	19.273	Tonndorf	3,9	13.691
Volksdorf	11,6	20.372	Wandsbek	6,0	33.591
Wellingsbüttel	4,1	10.415	Wohldorf-Ohlstedt	17,3	4.475

== Demographics ==
The population of Wandsbek in 2006 was 409,771 people. The population density was 2,777 inhabitants per square kilometre (7,192/sq mi). 16.5% were children under the age of 18, and 22% were 65 years of age or older. 10.1% were immigrants. 18,452 people were registered as unemployed. In 1999 there were 200,560 households, out of which 21.2% had children under the age of 18 living with them and 41.6% of all households were made up of individuals. The average household size was 2.02.

In 2006 there were 37,957 criminal offences in the borough (93 crimes per 1,000 people).

== Government ==
Wandsbek is a subdivision of Hamburg.

=== Borough Assembly ===
District parliament election of Wandsbek in 2024
Parties	%	±	Seats
Christian Democratic Union	27.9	▲5.7	16
Social Democratic Party	27.7	▲1.0	16
Alliance 90/The Greens	19.4	▼6.9	11
Alternative for Germany	11.0	▲3.3	6
The Left	7.0	▼0.2	4
Free Democratic Party	6.9	▼0.1	4
Total			57

== Infrastructure ==
There are 61 elementary and 46 secondary schools in the borough of Wandsbek, 695 physicians in private practice and 91 pharmacies.

According to the Department of Motor Vehicles (Kraftfahrt-Bundesamt), there are 171,334 private cars registered (421 cars/1000 people).

== Points of interest ==
- Botanischer Sondergarten Wandsbek, a municipal botanical garden
- Wandsbek Studios of Studio Hamburg GmbH

== See also ==
- Hamburg-Wandsbek (electoral district) the German federal parliamentary district covering the borough
- Seebek
- Jonathan Eybeschutz

== Notes ==
=== References ===
- Statistical office Hamburg and Schleswig-Holstein Statistisches Amt für Hamburg und Schleswig-Holstein, official website (in German)
