= Glacial landform =

Landform created by the action of glaciers

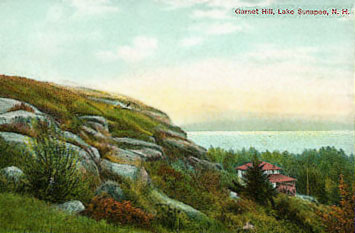
Antique postcard shows rocks scarred by glacial erosion

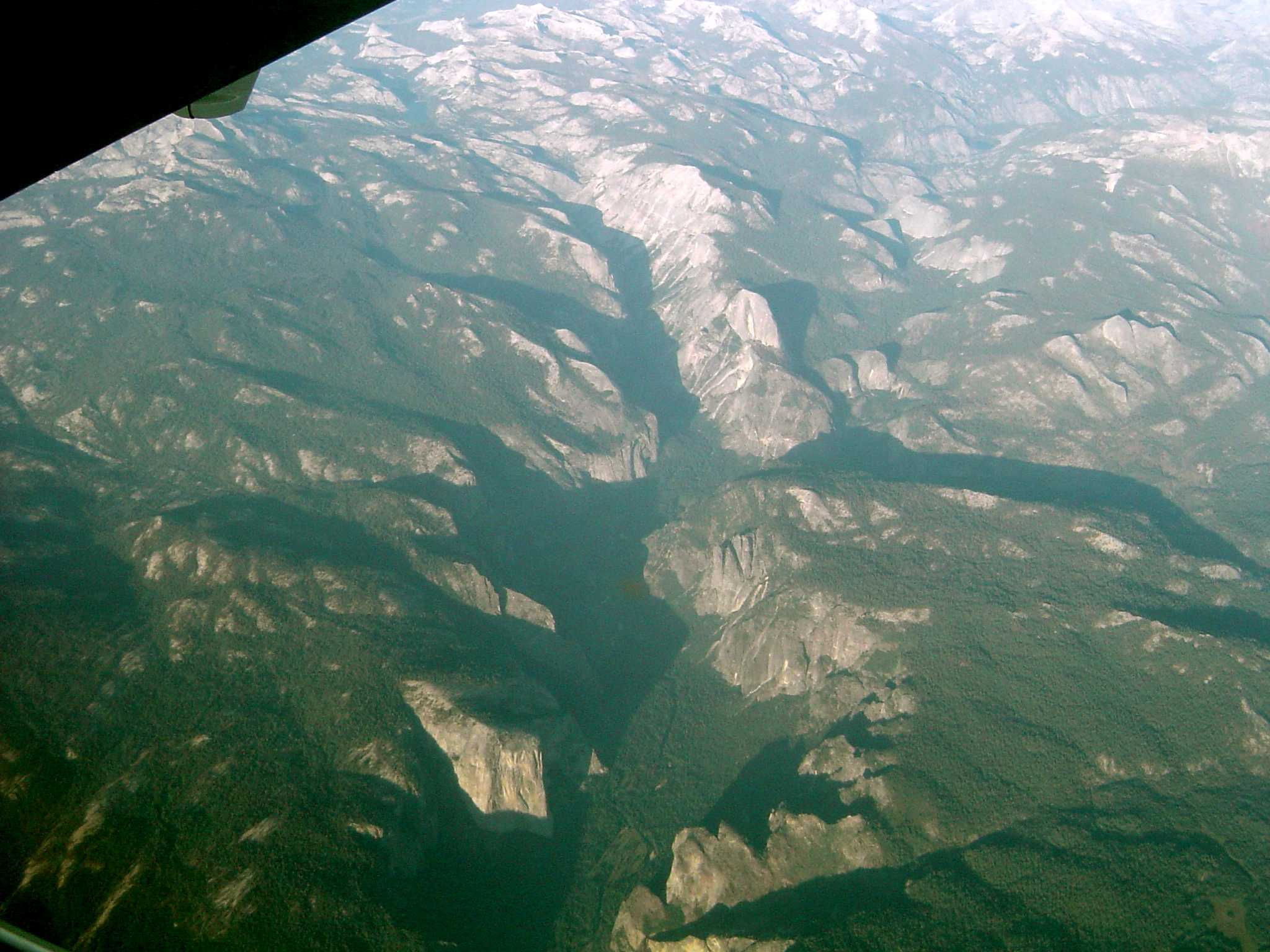
Yosemite Valley from an airplane, showing the "U" shape

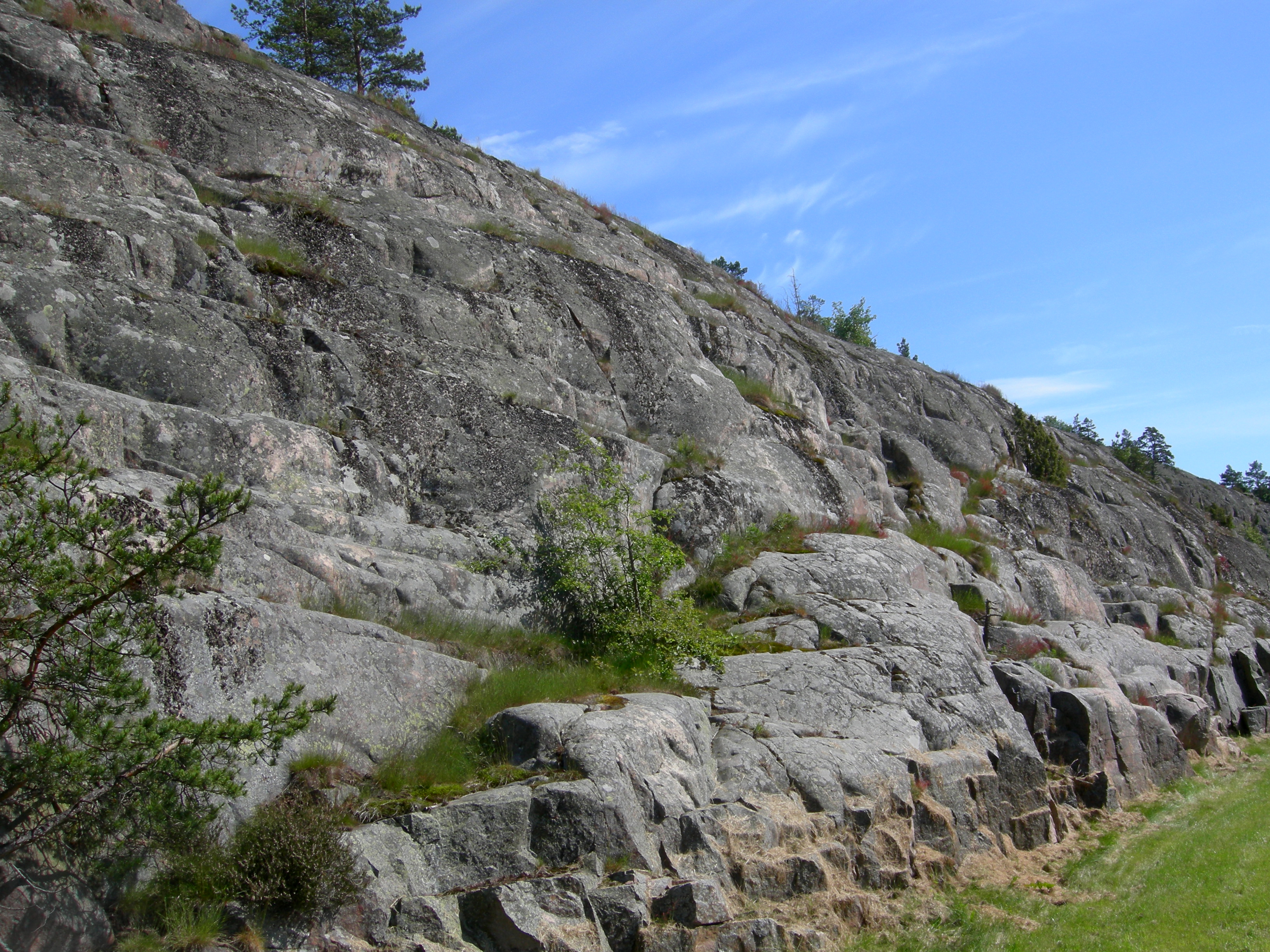
Glacially plucked granitic bedrock near Mariehamn, Åland

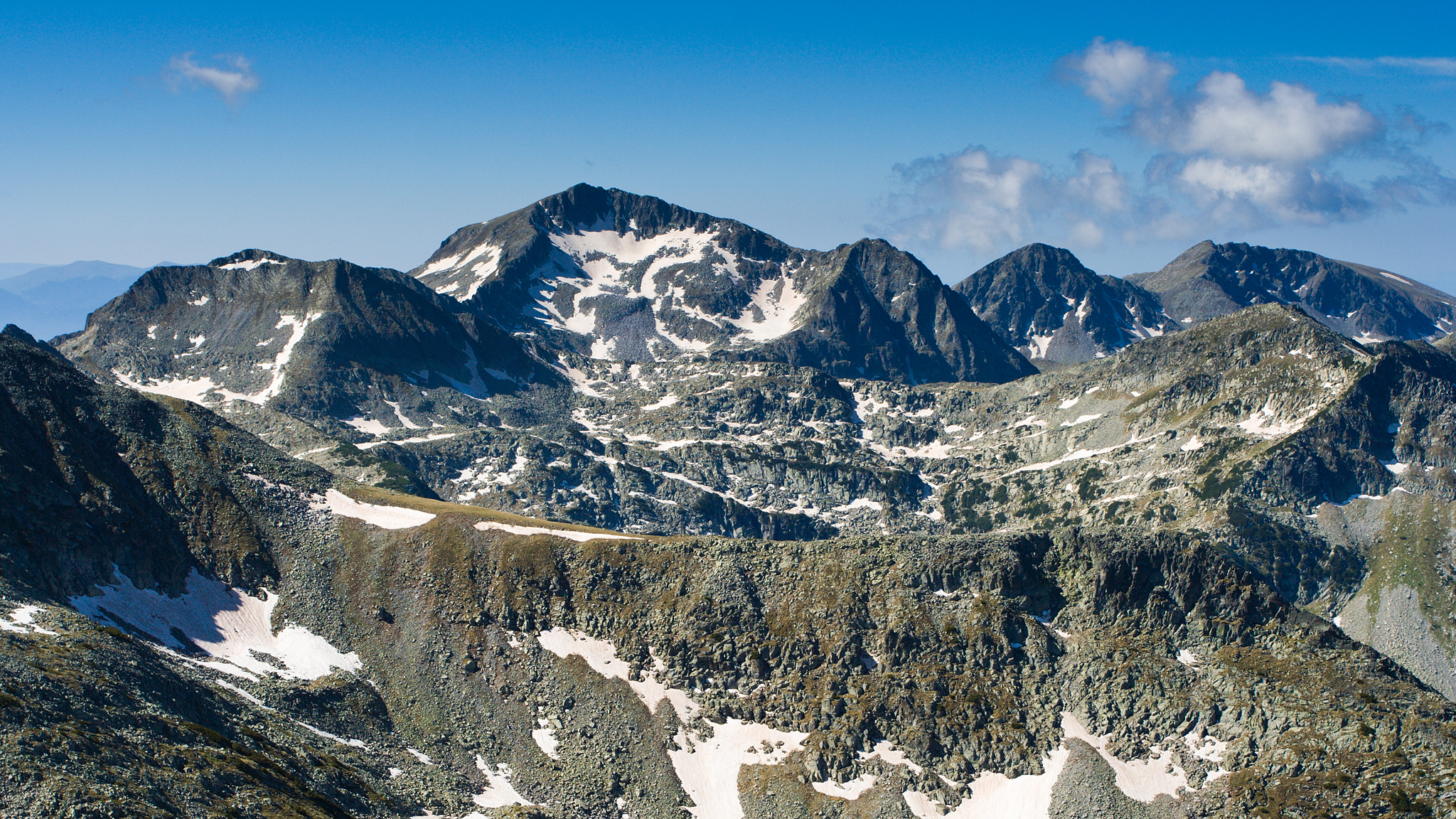
Kamenitsa Peak erosion in Pirin mountain, Bulgaria

Glacial landforms are landforms created by the action of glaciers. Most of today's glacial landforms were created by the movement of large ice sheets during the Quaternary glaciations. Some areas, like Fennoscandia and the southern Andes, have extensive occurrences of glacial landforms; other areas, such as the Sahara, display rare and very old fossil glacial landforms.

== Erosional landforms ==
Erosional landforms

As the glaciers expand, due to their accumulating weight of snow and ice they crush, abrade, and scour surfaces such as rocks and bedrock. The resulting erosional landforms include striations, cirques, glacial horns, arêtes, trim lines, U-shaped valleys, roches moutonnées, overdeepenings and hanging valleys.

- Striations: grooves and indentations in rock outcrops, formed by the scraping of small sediments on the bottom of a glacier across the Earth's surface. The direction of striations display the direction the glacier was moving.
- Cirque: Starting location for mountain glaciers, leaving behind a bowl shaped indentation in the mountain side once the small glacier has melted.(add geology book citation already in the article)
- Cirque stairway: a sequence of cirques
- U-shaped, or trough, valley: U-shaped valleys are created by mountain glaciers. When filled with ocean water so as to create an inlet, these valleys are called fjords.
- Arête: spiky high land between two glaciers. If the glacial action erodes through, a spillway (or col) forms
- Horn: a sharp peak connecting multiple glacier intersections, made up of multiple arêtes.
- Valley step: an abrupt change in the longitudinal slope of a glacial valley
- Hanging Valleys: Formed by glacial meltwater eroding the land partially, often accompanied by a waterfall.
- Roche moutonnée
- Nunatak

== Depositional landforms ==
Depositional landforms

Later, when the glaciers retreated leaving behind their freight of crushed rock and sand (glacial drift), they created characteristic depositional landforms. Depositional landforms are often made of glacial till, which is composed of unsorted sediments (some quite large, others small) that were eroded, carried, and deposited by the glacier some distance away from their original rock source. Examples include glacial moraines, eskers, and kames. Drumlins and ribbed moraines are also landforms left behind by retreating glaciers. Many depositional landforms result from sediment deposited or reshaped by meltwater and are referred to as fluvioglacial landforms. Fluvioglacial deposits differ from glacial till in that they were deposited by means of water, rather than the glacial itself, and the sediments are thus also more size sorted than glacial till is. The stone walls of New England contain many glacial erratics, rocks that were dragged by a glacier many miles from their bedrock origin.

- Esker: Built up bed of a subglacial stream, forming small, string-like mounds left behind as a glacier retreats.
- Kame: Irregularly shaped mound of sediments previously deposited by falling into an opening of glacial ice.
- Moraine: Built up mound of glacial till along a spot on the glacier. Feature can be terminal (at the end of a glacier, showing how far the glacier extended), lateral (along the sides of a glacier), or medial (formed by the merger of lateral moraines from contributory glaciers). Types: Pulju, Rogen, Sevetti, terminal, Veiki
- Outwash fan: Braided stream flowing from the front end of a glacier into a more flat, lower elevation plain of sediments.

== Glacial lakes and ponds ==
Lakes and ponds may also be caused by glacial movement. Kettle lakes form when a retreating glacier leaves behind an underground or surface chunk of ice that later melts to form a depression containing water. Moraine-dammed lakes occur when glacial debris dam a stream (or snow runoff). Jackson Lake and Jenny Lake in Grand Teton National Park are examples of moraine-dammed lakes, though Jackson Lake is enhanced by a man-made dam.

- Kettle lake: Depression, formed by a block of ice separated from the main glacier, in which the lake forms
- Tarn: A lake formed in a cirque by overdeepening
- Paternoster lake: A series of lakes in a glacial valley, formed when a stream is dammed by successive recessional moraines left by an advancing or retreating glacier
- Glacial lake: A lake that formed between the front of a glacier and the last recessional moraine

== Ice features ==
Apart from the landforms left behind by glaciers, glaciers themselves are striking features of the terrain, particularly in the polar regions of Earth. Notable examples include valley glaciers where glacial flow is restricted by the valley walls, crevasses in the upper section of glacial ice, and icefalls—the ice equivalent of waterfalls.

== Disputed origin ==
The glacial origin of some landforms has been questioned:

Erling Lindström has advanced the thesis that roches moutonnées may not be entirely glacial landforms, and may have already had most of their shape before glaciation. Jointing that contributes to their shape typically predates glaciation, and roche moutonnée-like forms can be found in tropical areas such as East Africa and Australia. Further, at Ivö Lake in Sweden, rock surfaces exposed by kaolin mining and then weathered resemble roche moutonnée.

The idea of elevated flat surfaces being shaped by glaciation—the glacial buzzsaw effect—has been rejected by various scholars. In the case of Norway the elevated paleic surface has been proposed to have been shaped by the glacial buzzsaw effect. However, this proposal is difficult to reconcile with the fact that the paleic surfaces consist of a series of steps at different levels. Glacial cirques, that in the buzzsaw hypothesis contribute to leveling the landscape, are not associated with any paleosurface levels of the composite paleic surface, nor does the modern equilibrium line altitude (ELA) or the Last Glacial Maximum ELA match any given level of the paleic surface. The elevated plains of West Greenland are also unrelated to any glacial buzzsaw effect.

The Gulf of Bothnia and Hudson Bay, two large depressions at the centre of former ice sheets, are known to be more the result of tectonics than of any weak glacial erosion.

== See also ==
- Glacial series – Environmental Biome in Central Europe
- Nunatak – Landform within an ice field or glacier
- Pyramidal peak – Angular, sharply pointed mountainous peak
- Fluvioglacial landform
- Glaciofluvial deposits
- Limno-glacial
- UNESCO Global Geoparks
