= Sevetti moraine =

Geographic feature in northern Finland

The Sevetti moraine is a particular assemblage of morainic forms found between Partakko and Sevettijärvi in northern Finland. The Sevetti moraines are disposed in trains about 50 kilometres (30 miles) long and 2 to 3 kilometres (1 to 2 miles) wide. They have rugged surfaces.

== See also ==
- Pulju moraine
- Veiki moraine
