= Timmermoor =

Coordinates: 53°39′48″N 10°08′27″E

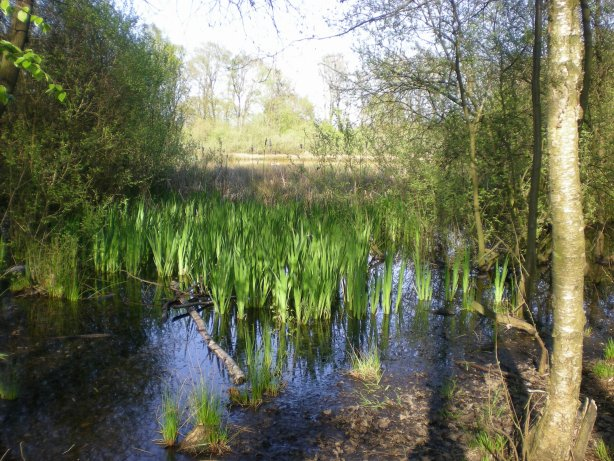
The Timmermoor in Bergstedt

The Timmermoor is a natural monument, about 4 hectares in area, in the southeast of Bergstedt, a quarter of Hamburg, Germany. It was placed under protection by a Hamburg senate act of 4 February 1986.

The bog pond is a kettle hole that formed around 20,000 years ago during the last ice age and is surrounded by heathland and woods. Contrary to earlier suppositions that it was a hole scoured out by a tornado, it is now thought that the hollow was formed by the settling of soil layers over thawing dead ice.

The area is a habitat for rare bog plants that are sensitive to trampling underfoot and that are only able to live on nutrient-poor soils. In addition, endangered dragonflies and amphibians live here.
