= Furtbek =

Coordinates: 53.6688°N 10.1117°E

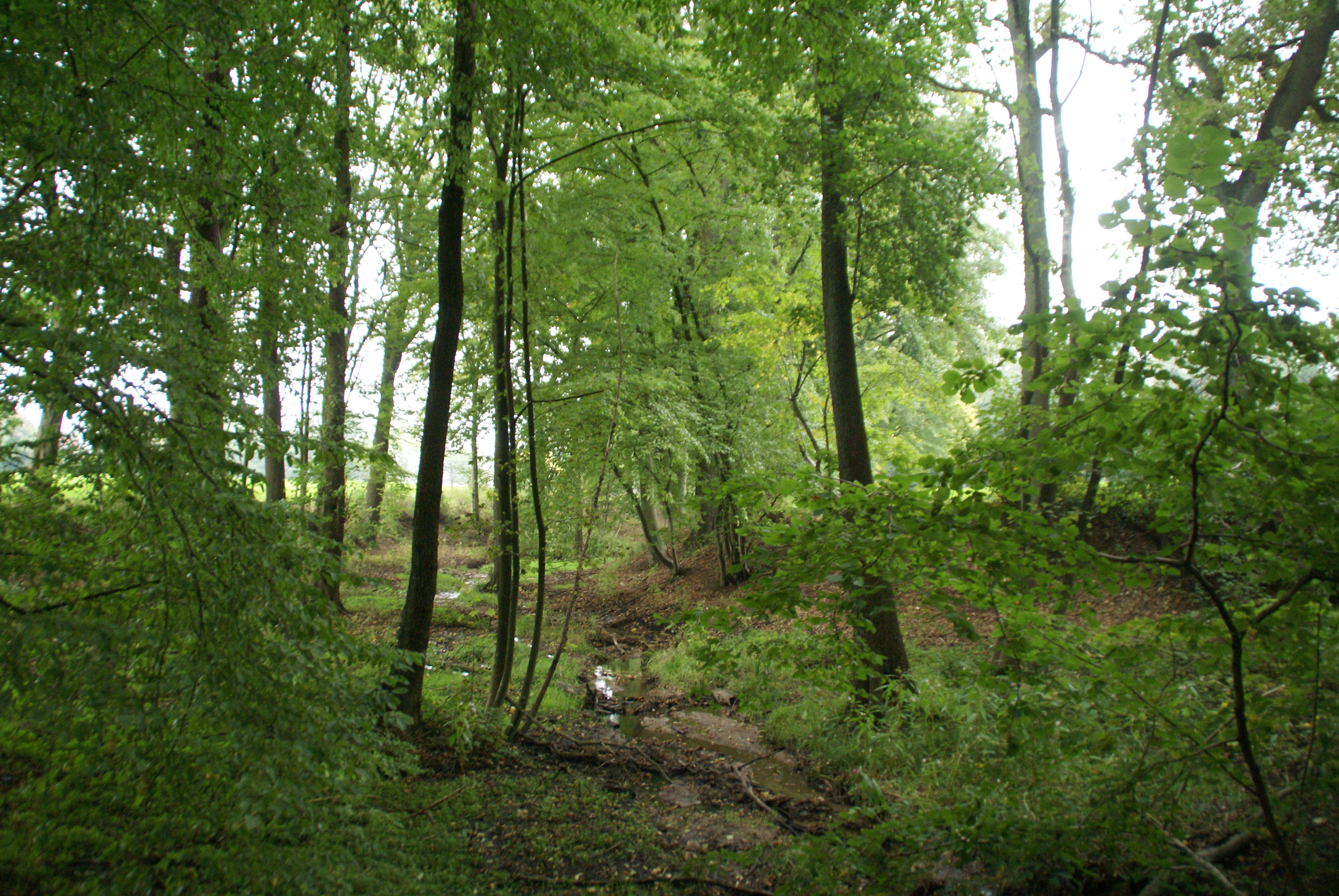
- The Furtbek in Bergstedt

Location
- Country: Germany
- State: Hamburg

Physical characteristics
- Mouth
  - location: Saselbek

Basin features
- Progression: Saselbek→ Alster→ Elbe→ North Sea

The Furtbek is a stream in Hamburg in the outer north-east of the city.

== Geography ==
The stream begins at the street of Volksdorfer Damm in the Hamburg quarter of Bergstedt. It then flows westward and joins the Saselbek stream near the nature reserve of Hainesch/Iland, above the Old Mill. The stream name refers to a ford (Furt-) and a small stream (-bek).

In the lower reaches, the Furtbek has steep banks. Occasionally a kingfisher can be seen there hunting.

Renaturation projects are carried out at some parts of the stream.
