= U-shaped valley =

Valleys formed by glacial scouring

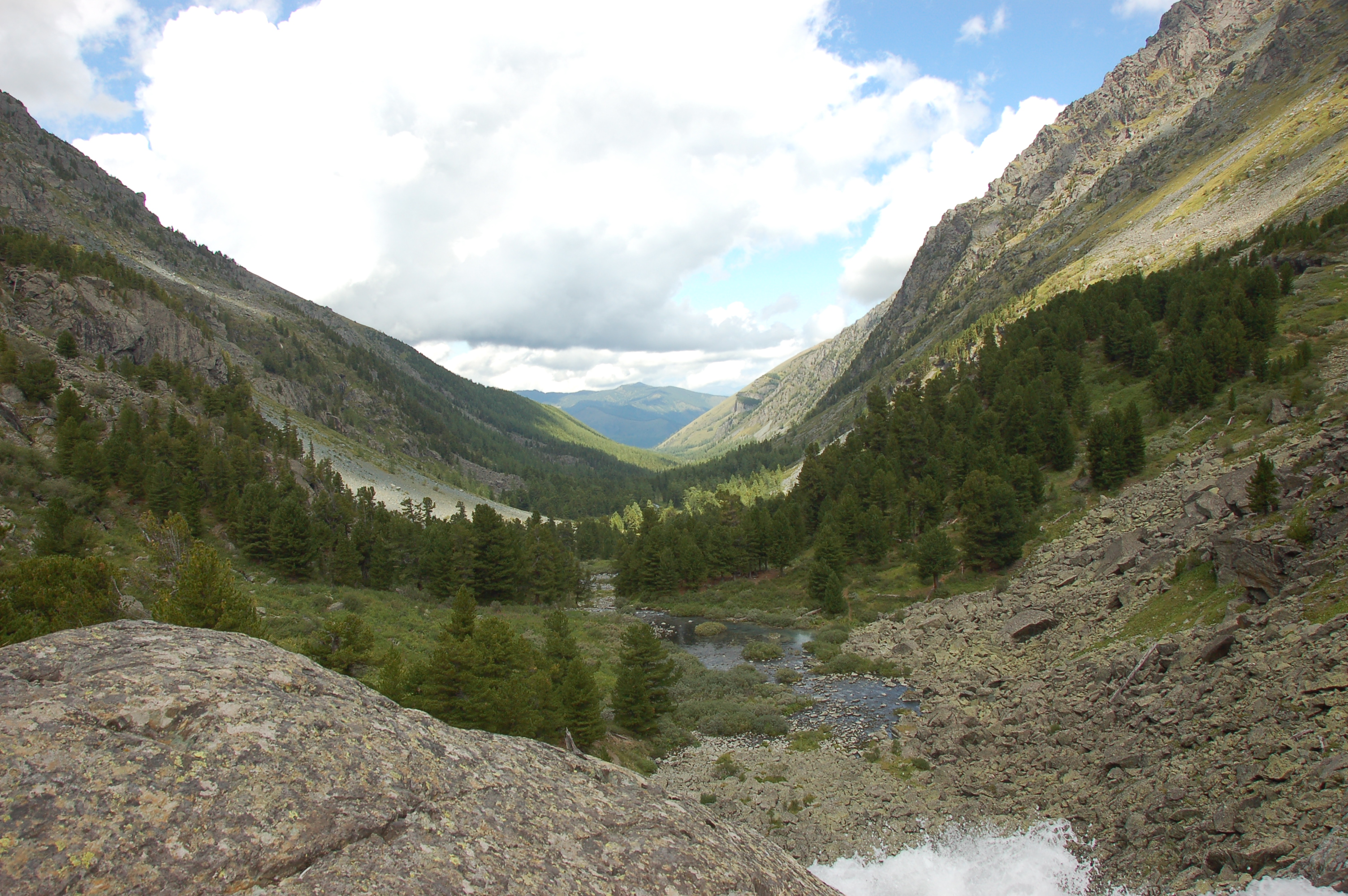
A glaciated valley in the Altai Mountains of Russia showing the characteristic U shape.

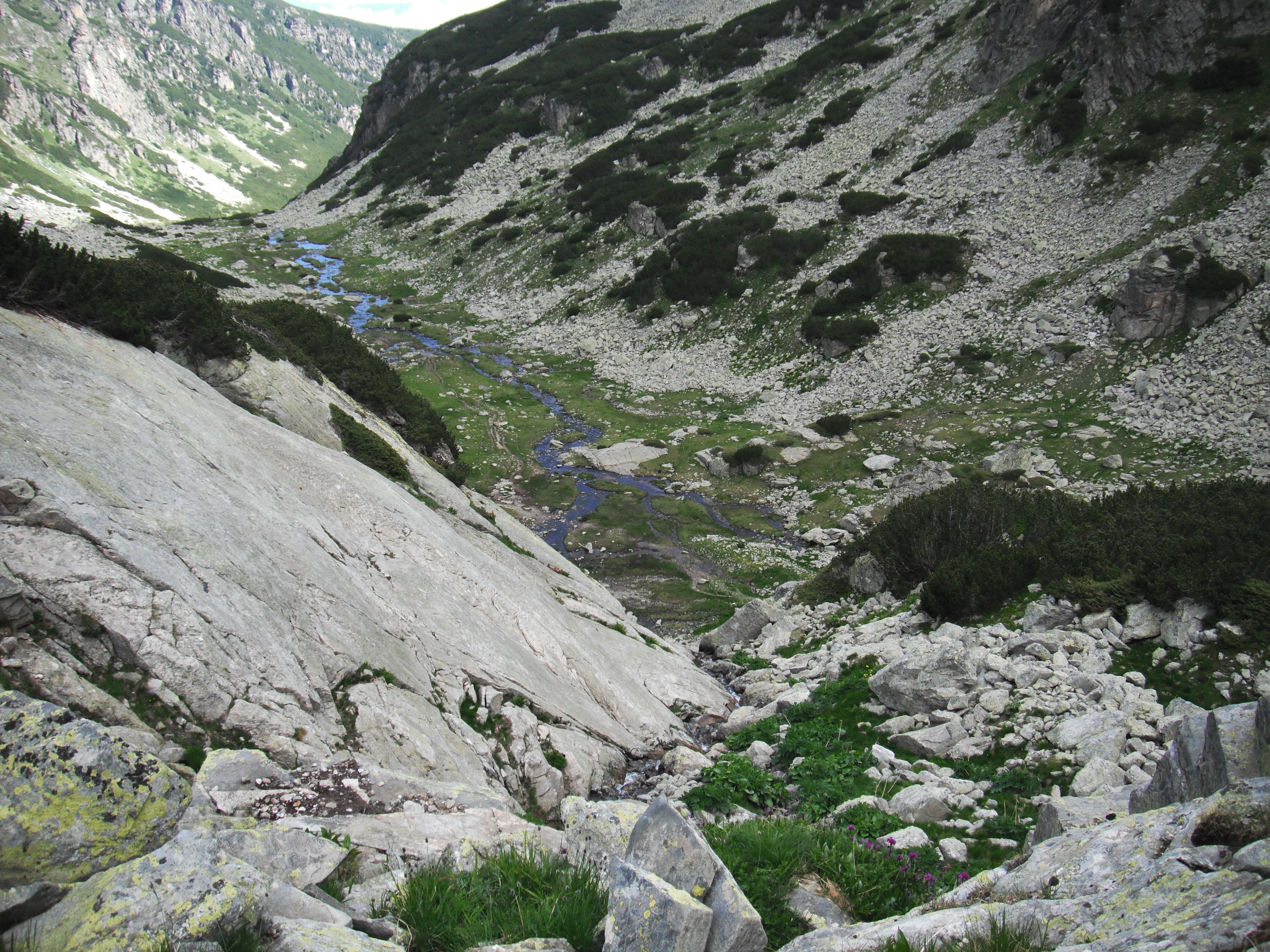
Malyovitsa U-shaped valley, Rila Mountain, Bulgaria

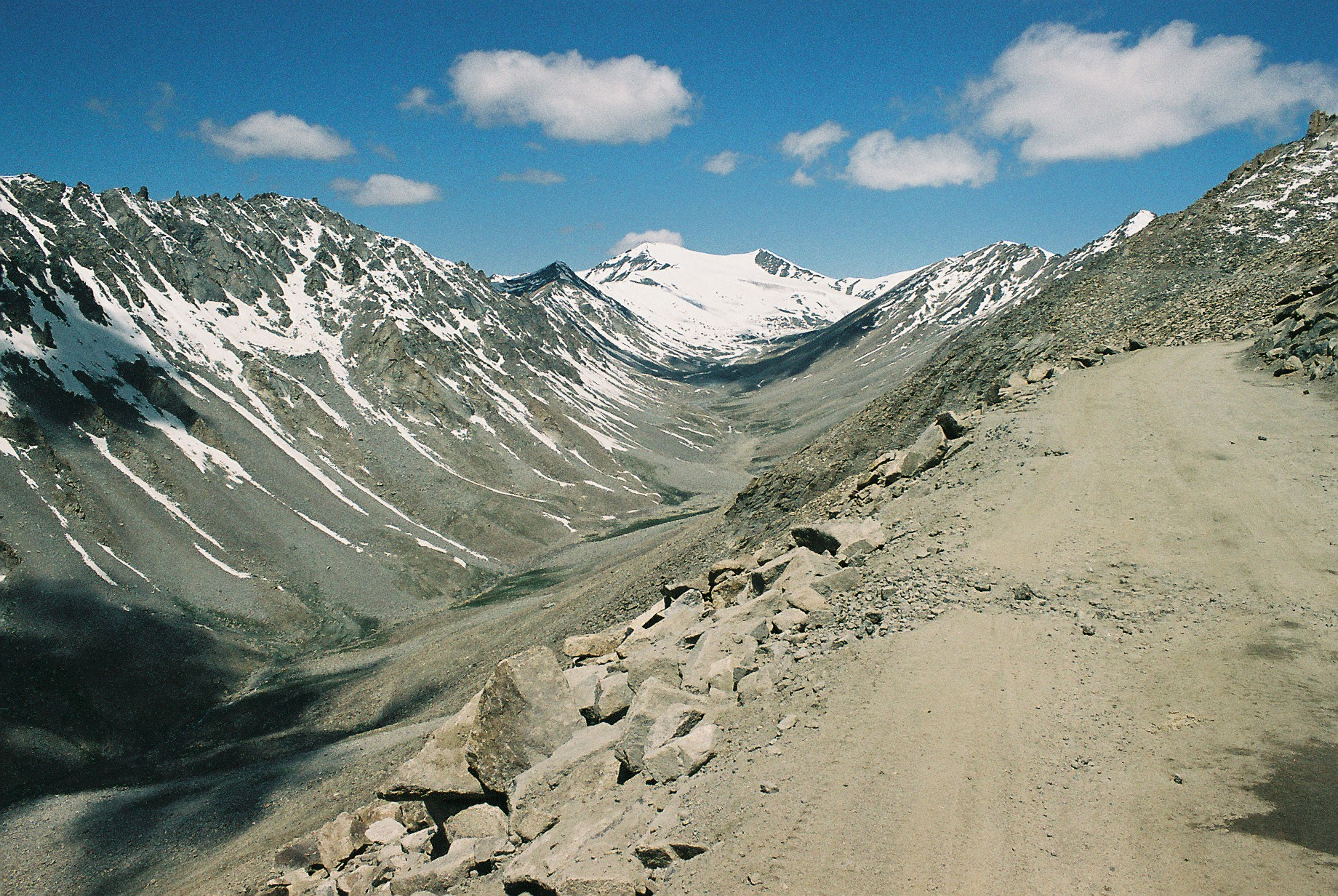
U-shaped valley in Leh valley, Ladakh, NW Indian Himalaya. The glacier visible at the head of the valley is the last remnant of the formerly much more extensive glacier which carved it.

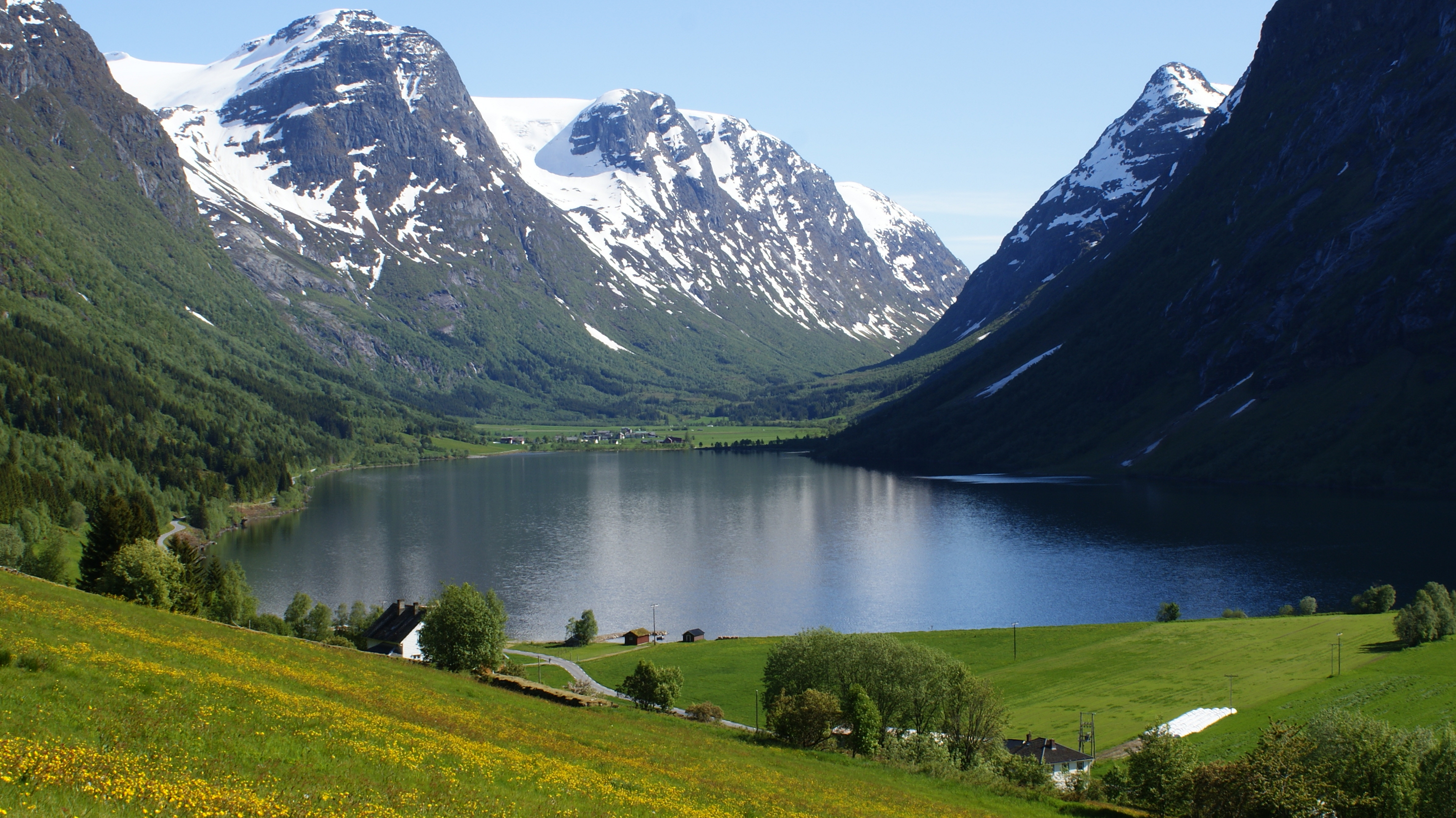
U-shaped valley with lake in Myklebustdalen, Nordfjord, Sogn og Fjordane, Norway.

U-shaped valleys, also called trough valleys or glacial troughs, are formed by the process of glaciation. They are characteristic of mountain glaciation in particular. They have a characteristic U shape in cross-section, with steep, straight sides and a flat or rounded bottom (by contrast, valleys carved by rivers tend to be V-shaped in cross-section). Glaciated valleys are formed when a glacier travels across and down a slope, carving the valley by the action of scouring. When the ice recedes or thaws, the valley remains, often littered with small boulders that were transported within the ice, called glacial till or glacial erratic.

Examples of U-shaped valleys are found in mountainous regions throughout the world including the Andes, Alps, Caucasus Mountains, Himalaya, Rocky Mountains, New Zealand and the Scandinavian Mountains. They are found also in other major European mountains including the Carpathian Mountains, the Pyrenees, the Rila and Pirin mountains in Bulgaria, the Comeragh Mountains in Ireland and the Scottish Highlands. A classic glacial trough is in Glacier National Park in Montana, USA in which the St. Mary River runs. Another well-known U-shaped valley is the Nant Ffrancon valley in Snowdonia, Wales.

When a U-shaped valley extends into saltwater, becoming an inlet of the sea, it is called a fjord, from the Norwegian word for these features that are common in Norway. Outside of Norway, a classic U-shaped valley that is also a fjord is the Western Brook Pond Fjord in Gros Morne National Park in Newfoundland, Canada.

== Formation ==
Glacier Valley formation

=== Shape ===
Formation of a U-shaped valley happens over geologic time, meaning not during a human's lifespan. It can take anywhere between 10,000 and 100,000 years for a V-shaped valley to be carved into a U-shaped valley. These valleys can be several thousand feet deep and tens of miles long. Glaciers will spread out evenly in open areas, but tend to carve deep into the ground when confined to a valley. Ice thickness is a major contributing factor to valley depth and carving rates. As a glacier moves downhill through a valley, usually with a stream running through it, the shape of the valley is transformed. As the ice melts and retreats, the valley is left with very steep sides and a wide, flat floor. This parabolic shape is caused by glacial erosion removing the contact surfaces with greatest resistance to flow, and the resulting section minimises friction. There are two main variations of this U-shape. The first is called the Rocky Mountain model and it is attributed to alpine glacial valleys, showing an overall deepening effect on the valley. The second variation is referred to as the Patagonia-Antarctica model, attributed to continental ice sheets and displaying an overall widening effect on its surroundings.

=== Valley floor ===
The floors of these glacial valleys are where the most evidence can be found regarding glaciation cycles. For the most part, the valley floor is wide and flat, but there are various glacial features that signify periods of ice transgression and regression. The valley can have various steps, known as valley steps, and over-deepenings anywhere from ten to hundreds of meters deep. These then fill in with sediments to create plains or water to create lakes, sometimes referred to as "string-of-pearl" or ribbon lakes. Such water filled U-valley basins are also known as "fjord-lakes" or "valley-lakes" (Norwegian: fjordsjø or dalsjø). Gjende and Bandak lakes in Norway are examples of fjord-lakes. Some of these fjord-lakes are very deep for instance Mjøsa (453 meters) and Hornindalsvatnet (514 m). The longitudinal profile of a U-shaped, glaciated valley is often stepwise where flat basins are interrupted by thresholds. Rivers often dig a V-shaped valley or gorge through the threshold.

Surrounding smaller tributary valleys will often join the main valleys during glaciation periods, leaving behind features known as hanging valleys high in the trough walls after the ice melts.

After deglaciation, snow and ice melt from the mountain tops can create streams and rivers in U-shaped valleys. These are referred to as misfit streams. The streams that form in hanging valleys create waterfalls that flow into the main valley branch. Glacial valleys may also have natural, often dam-like, structures within them, called moraines. They are created due to excess sediment and glacial till moved and deposited by the glacier.

In volcanic mountain ranges, such as the Principal Cordillera of the Andes, glacial valley floors may be covered by thick lava flows.

=== Trough end ===
A glacial trough or glaciated mountain valley often ends in an abrupt head known as the 'trough end' or 'trough head'. This may have almost sheer rock walls and spectacular waterfalls. They are believed to have been formed where a number of small glaciers merge to produce a much larger glacier. Examples include: Warnscale Bottom in the Lake District, Yosemite Valley, and the Rottal and Engstlige valleys in Switzerland.

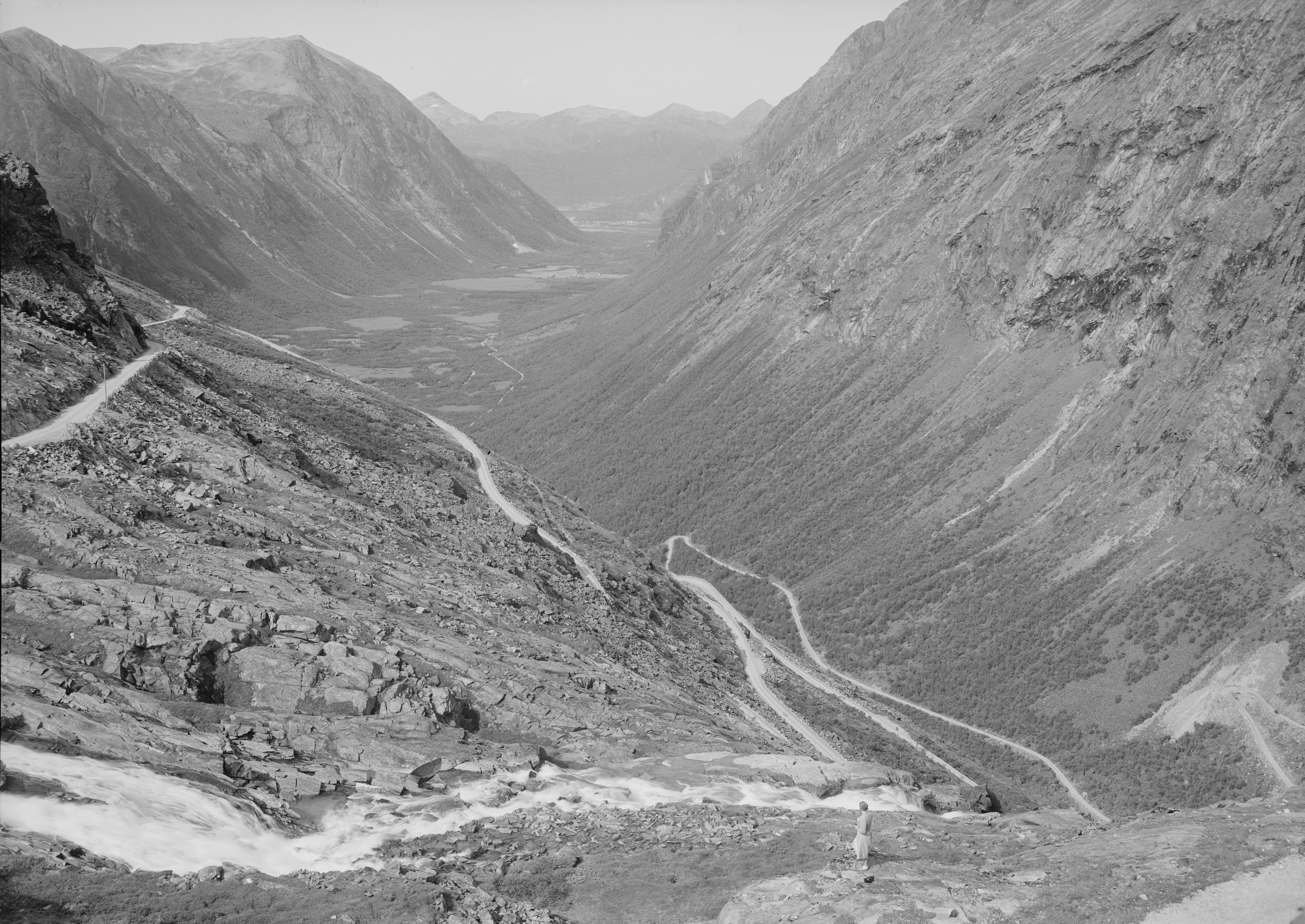
The deep U-shaped Isterdalen valley in Norway ends abruptly giving rise to tall waterfalls. Trollstigen road climbs the steep cliffs of the trough end.

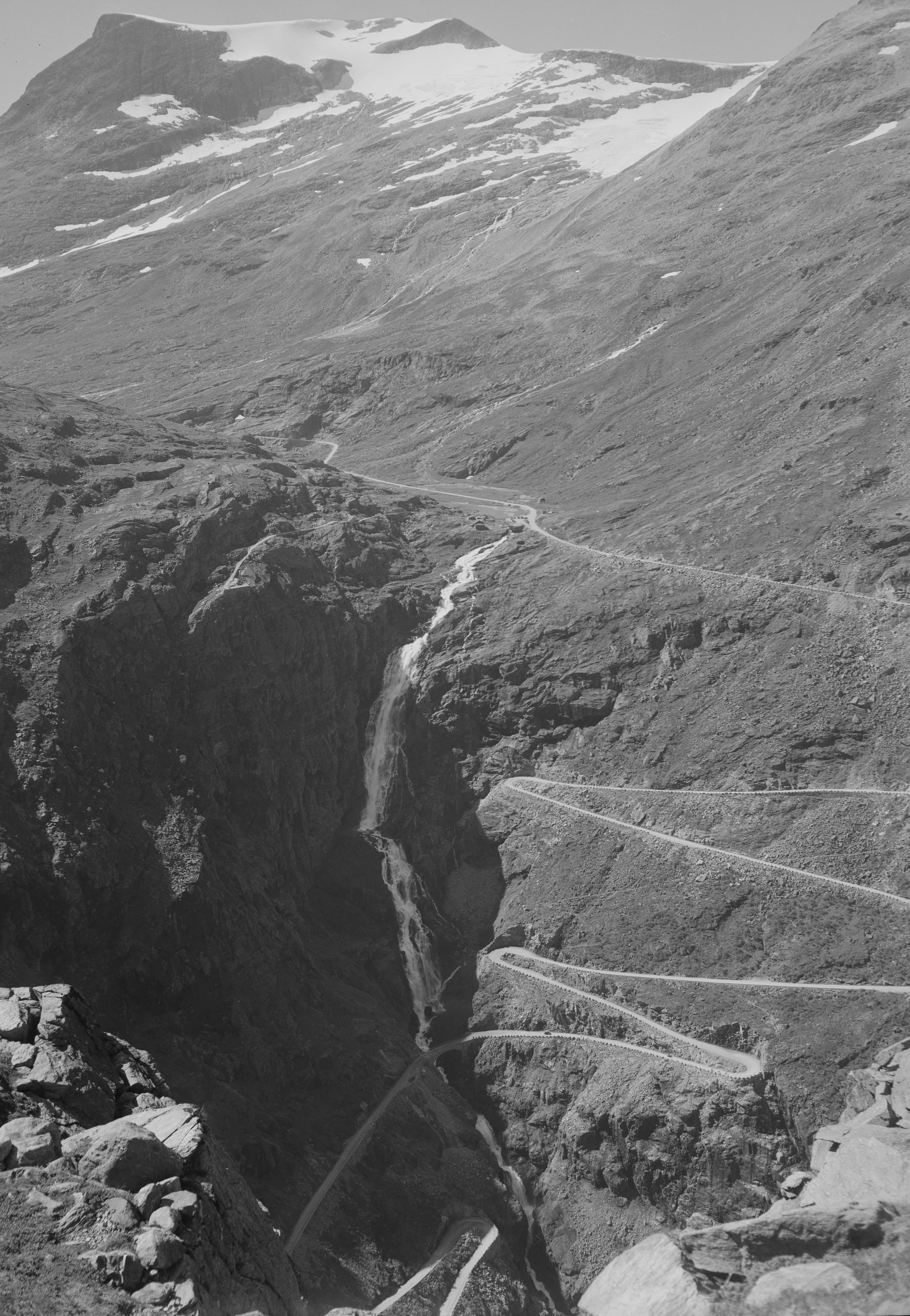
Valley head or trough end at Isterdalen from a different angle showing Trollstigen road and waterfall

=== Marine troughs ===
Glacial troughs also exist as submarine valleys on continental shelves, such as the Laurentian Channel. These geomorphic features significantly influence sediment distribution and biological communities through their modification of current patterns.

== History ==
Geologists did not always believe that glaciers were responsible for U-shaped valleys and other glacial erosional features. Ice is quite soft and it was unbelievable to many that it could be responsible for the severe carving of bedrock characteristic of glacial erosion. German geologist Penck and American geologist Davis were vocal supporters of this unprecedented glacial erosion.

Progress was made in the 1970s and 1980s on the possible mechanisms of glacial erosion and U-shaped valleys via models proposed by various scientists. Numerical models have been created to explain the phenomenon of carving U-shaped valleys.

== See also ==
- Glacial landforms – Landform created by the action of glaciers
- Hanging valley – A tributary valley that meets the main valley above the valley floor
- High valley – Valley in the upper third of a mountain range
- Moraine – Glacially formed accumulation of debris
- Ribbon Lake – Long and narrow, finger-shaped lake, usually found in a glacial trough
- Side valley – Valley with a tributary to a larger river
