= Head of the valley =

Geographical feature

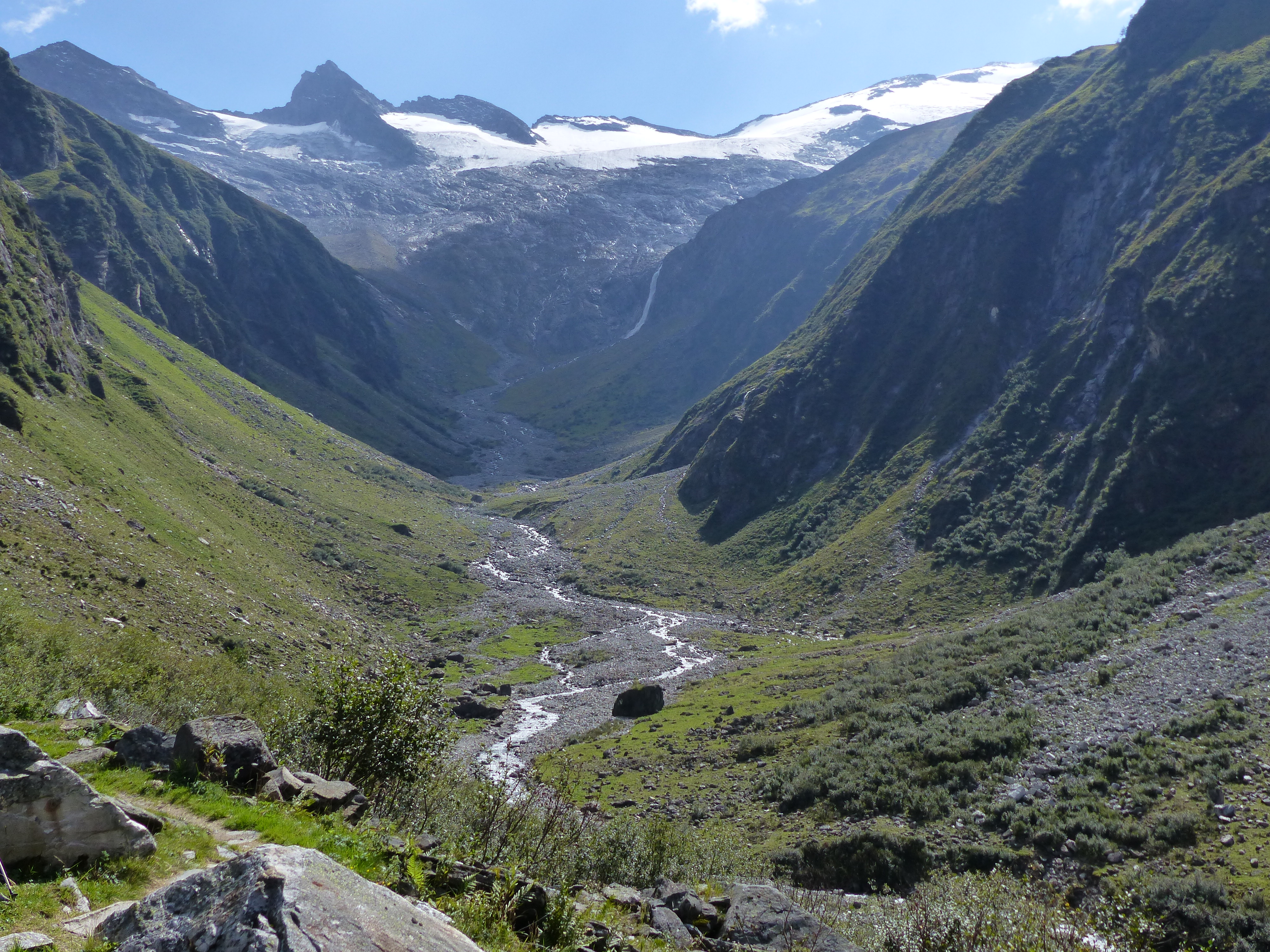
The head of the Habachtal valley in the High Tauern in Austria

The head of the valley or, less commonly, the valley head, is the uppermost part of a valley.

== Description ==
The head of a valley may take widely differing forms; for example, in highland regions the valley often ends in a broad, evenly sloping hollow. The higher the head of the valley, the more likely it is to resemble the geomorphological shape of a cirque. In glacial valleys or trough valleys, it may be referred to as the trough head or trough end.

In mountains with predominantly crystalline rock the heads of the valleys are generally very wet, sometimes boggy and often support lush alpine meadows, whilst those made of limestone are usually dry and covered in talus or gravel. Where there has been ice age glaciation, the valley bottoms are modified by moraines and mountain lakes are common.

== See also ==
- Structural basin
- U-shaped or trough valley
- Landform
- Valley step

== Bibliography ==
- Leser, Hartmut, ed. (2005). Wörterbuch Allgemeine Geographie, 13th ed., dtv, Munich, ISBN 978-3-423-03422-7.
