= Bergstedt =

- Quarter of Hamburg
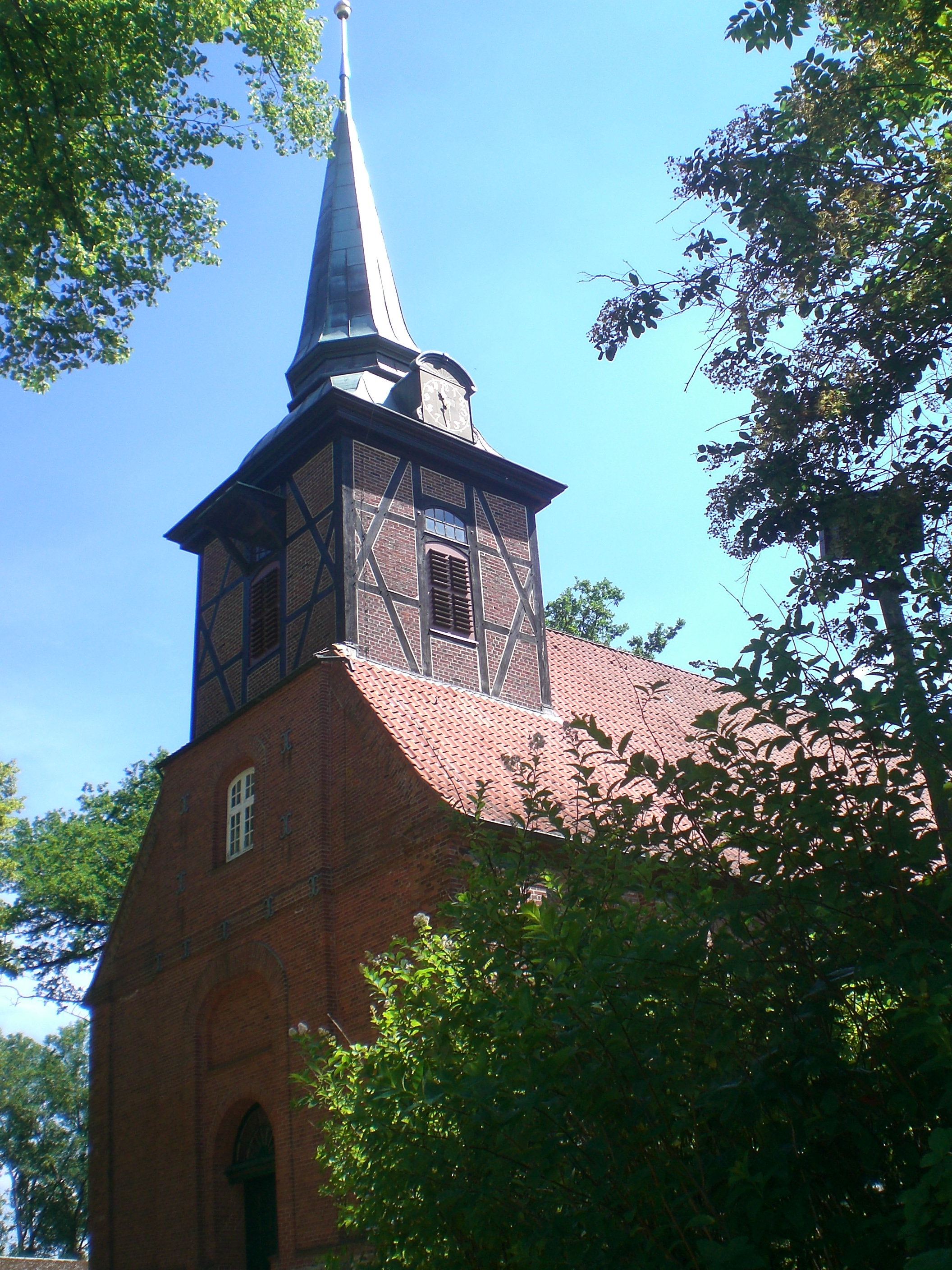
- The church of Bergstedt in 2011

- Location of Bergstedt in Hamburg
- Interactive map of Bergstedt
- Location within Germany Location within Hamburg
- Coordinates: 53.671111°N 10.126944°E
- Country: Germany
- State: Hamburg
- City: Hamburg
- Borough: Hamburg-Wandsbek

Area
  - Total: 7.1 km^{2} (2.7 sq mi)

Population (2024-12-31)
  - Total: 10,822
  - Density: 1,500/km^{2} (3,900/sq mi)
- Time zone: UTC+01:00 (CET)
  - Summer (DST): UTC+02:00 (CEST)
- Dialling codes: 040
- Vehicle registration: HH

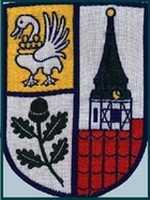
Blazon of Bergstedt

Bergstedt (German pronunciation: [ˈbɛʁkˌʃtɛt]) is a quarter of Hamburg, Germany, in the borough of Wandsbek. It is located on the northeastern border of the borough and of the city. It is part of the area of Walddörfer (lit. forest villages). In 2023 10,855 lived in Bergstedt.

== Geography ==
Bergstedt borders the quarters of Lemsahl-Mellingstedt, Wohldorf-Ohlstedt, Volksdorf, and Sasel. The streams and rivers of Furtbek, Lottbek, Rodenbek, and Saselbek flow through Bergstedt. There are two nature reserves, Hainesch/Iland and Rodenbeker Quellental.

== Politics ==
These are the results of Bergstedt in the Hamburg state election:

Election	Bergstedt						
Election	SPD	Greens	CDU	FDP	Left	AfD	Others
2020	40,7 %	27,3 %	11,8 %	6,0 %	5,4 %	4,7 %	4,1 %
2015	48,0 %	13,7 %	15,3 %	8,5 %	5,8 %	5,8 %	2,9 %
2011	49,9 %	13,2 %	20,6 %	8,6 %	3,9 %	–	3,8 %
2008	31,3 %	12,6 %	44,1 %	5,9 %	4,5 %	–	1,6 %
2004	26,1 %	16,2 %	49,2 %	3,9 %	–	–	4,7 %
2001	34,0 %	10,9 %	30,0 %	5,8 %	0,3 %	–	19,0 %
1997	30,7 %	17,2 %	35,4 %	4,0 %	0,3 %	–	12,4 %
1993	32,1 %	18,6 %	28,5 %	4,7 %	–	–	16,1 %

== History ==
In 1248 Bergstedt, formerly a Saxonian Rundling, was first recorded under the name of Bericstede. It does not relate to a Berg (mountain), but to a founder named Beric. Also the part -stedt in the name refers to a Saxonian foundation, meaning safe settlement or safe residence. The Church of Bergstedt (Bergstedter Kirche) was also first recorded in 1248, its oldest parts originating from 13th century. Therefore it is one of the oldest church buildings in Hamburg.

=== Nature reserves ===
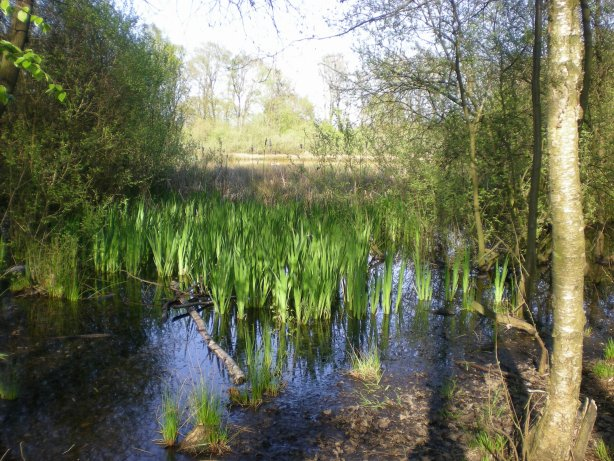
Timmermoor

In the southeast of Bergstadt lies the natural monument of Timmermoor, roughly 4 hectares in area, a bog pond surrounded by heathland and woods, which was formed in the last ice age about 20,000 years ago, probably as a result of the sinking of the soil layers over thawing dead ice.

In the southwest of the quarter, between the Alster tributary of the Saselbek and its tributary, the Furtbek, lies the Hainesch/Iland Nature Reserve.

In the north lies the Rodenbeker Quellental Nature Reserve.
