= Washboard moraine =

Rock formation caused by glaciers

A washboard moraine, also known as minor or corrugated moraine, is a geomorphic feature caused by glaciers. The name "washboard moraine" refers to the fact that, from the air, it resembles a washboard.

== Formation ==
The exact washboard formation mechanism is not known. One theory proposes that as the glacier melts it leaves behind an accumulation of rock debris in the form of annual recessional moraines. These annual glacial advances and recessions cause parallel ridges to form a few metres apart. Because the accumulation of debris is annual, the moraines do not get very large and stand only a few metres high.

An alternative theory is that basal till, weakened by high pore water pressure, deformed upwards into parallel basal crevasses a short distance in from the glacial margin. Crevasse fields of similar geometry to fields of washboard moraines have been observed on ice shelves of Antarctica experiencing large amounts of longitudinal extension, similar to the stresses that would have been experienced by the glaciers that formed these moraines.

== Examples ==
Washboard moraines can be seen in many places such as South Dakota, Iowa, Maine, and Iceland.
