= Pulju moraine =

Type of moraine found in northern Finland

A Pulju moraine (Swedish: Pulju-morän) is a type of moraine found in northern Finland. Pulju moraines were first identified as distinct moraine type in 1967 by Finnish geologist Raimo Kujansuu who noticed moraines that resembled Veiki moraines as those described by Gunnar Hoppe in 1952 but were smaller. Raimo Kujansuu described Pulju moraines with the following words:

...consists of small hummocks, often only from one to five meters high, or of ridges of the same height and between 50 and 300 meters long, which are situated helter-skelter or in thick clusters running either parallel to the movement or margin of the ice sheet or crossvalleywise. In many spots one also meets with ring ridges, measuring no more than 50 to 150 meters in diameter. The slopes are gentle and the hollows between the ridges are mostly filled with peat.

Together with Veiki moraines Pulju moraines form landscapes of the type "ice-walled lake plains".

== See also ==
- Pulju Wilderness Area
- Terminal moraine
- List of glacial moraines
