= Saselbek =

River in Germany

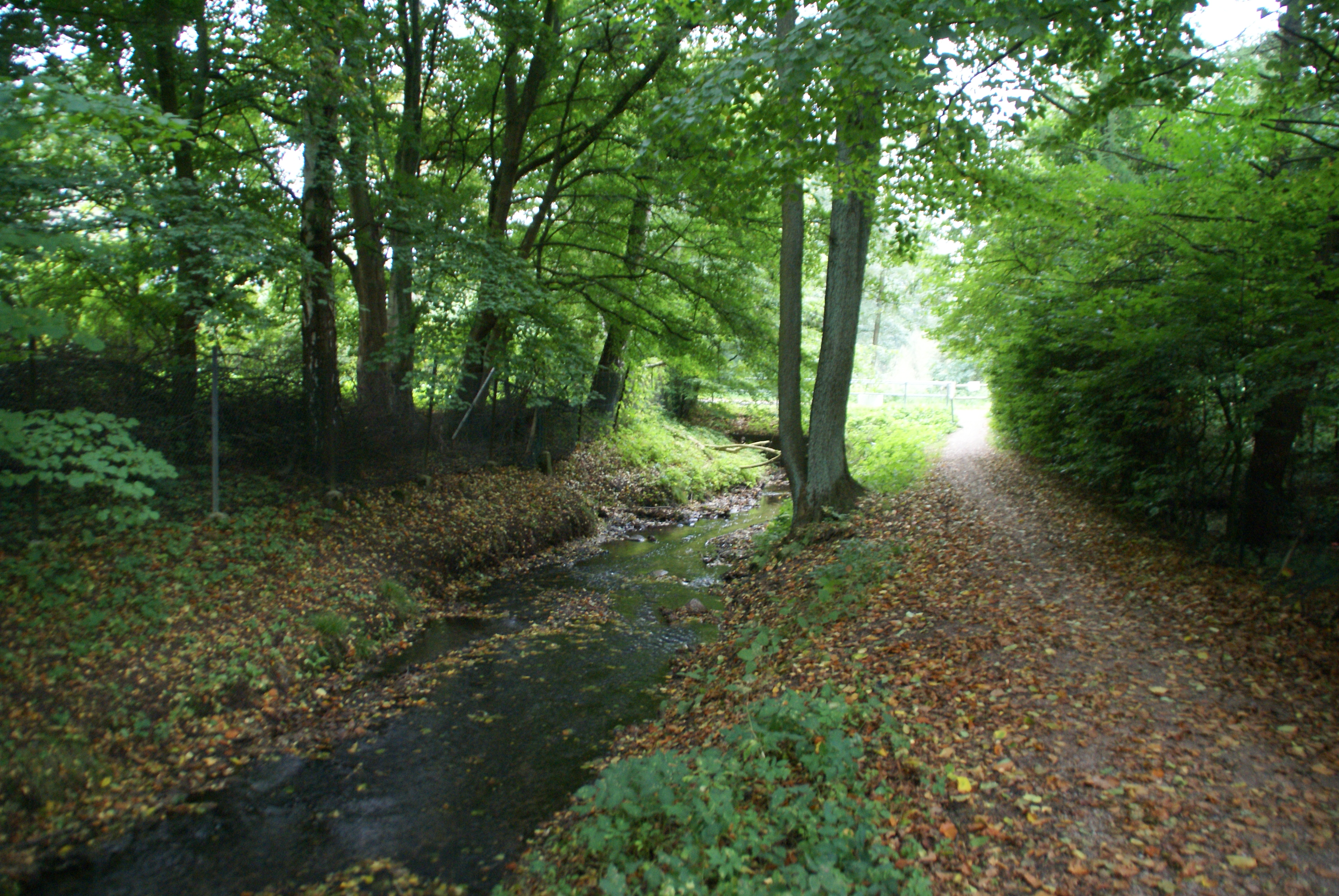

Location
- Country: Germany
- States: Hamburg

Physical characteristics
- Mouth
  - location: Alster
  - coordinates: 53.6701°N 10.1068°E

Basin features
- Progression: Alster→ Elbe→ North Sea

Saselbek is a short, little river of Hamburg, Germany. It flows into the Alster near Hamburg-Bergstedt.

== See also ==
- List of rivers of Hamburg
