= Valley step =

Prominent change in the longitudinal slope of a valley

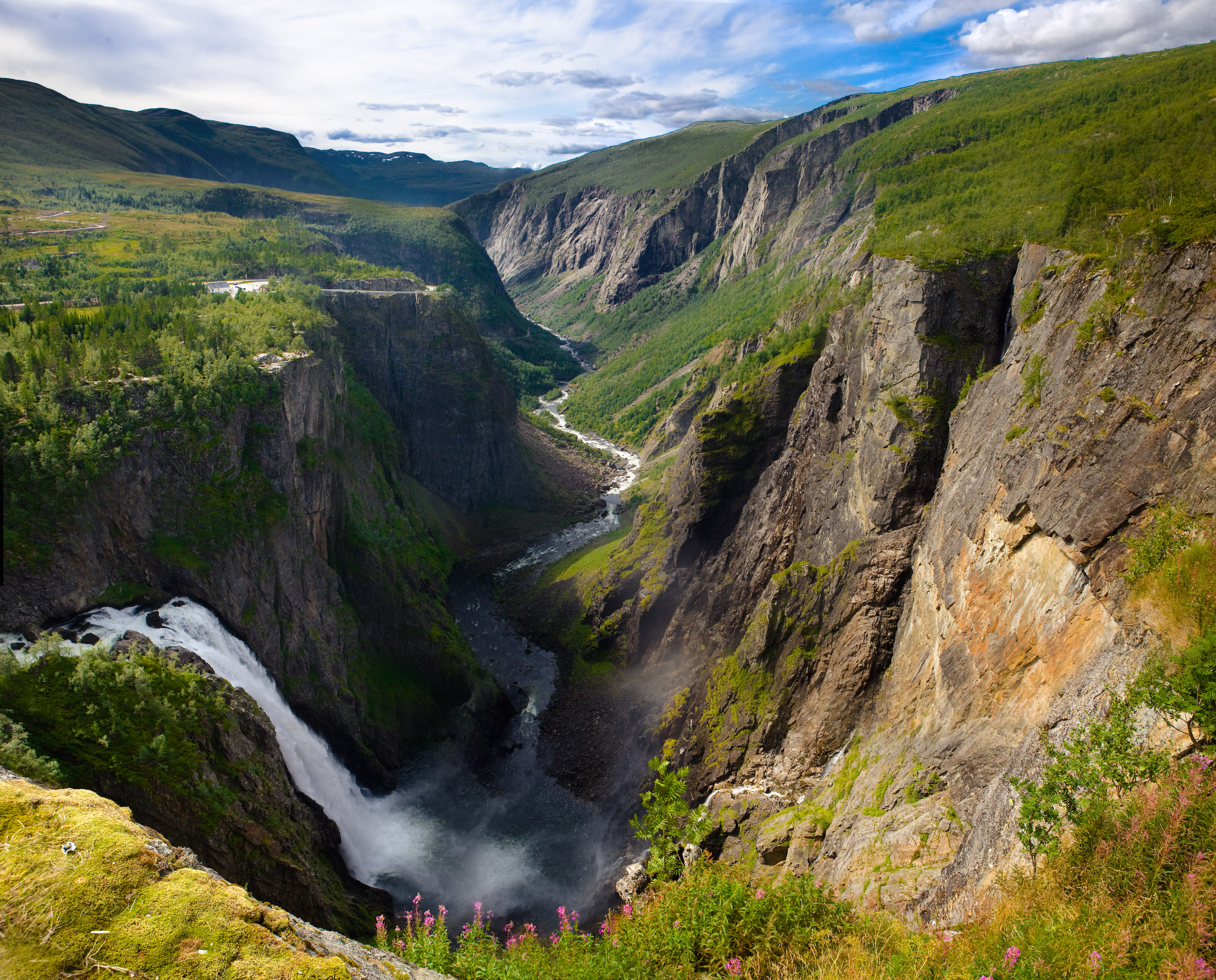
Valley step forming the beginning of a trough valley (Hardangervidda)

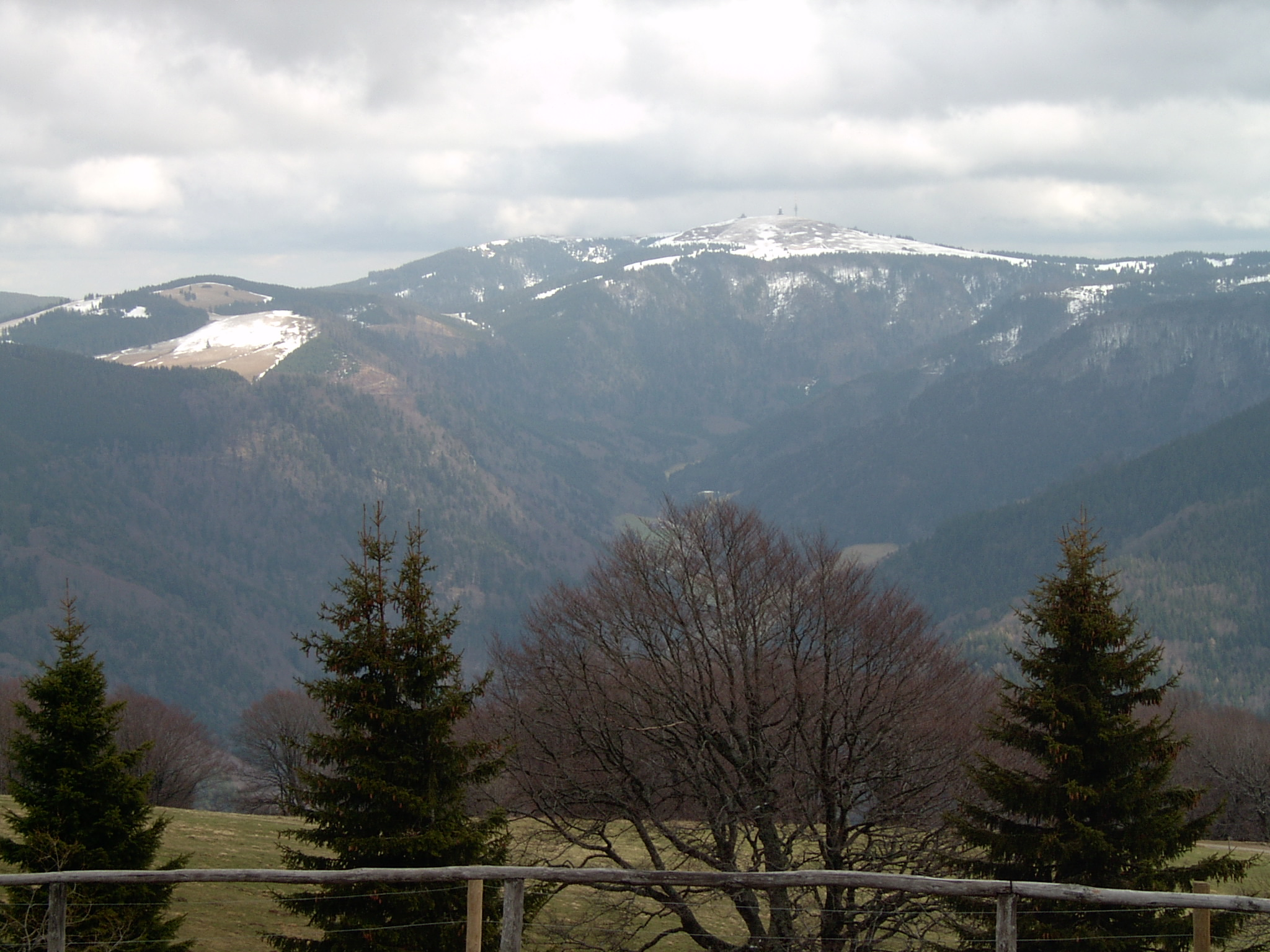
Trough head of the St. Wilhelm Valley (Southern Black Forest)

A valley step (German: Talstufe or Talschwelle) is a prominent change in the longitudinal slope of a valley, mainly in trough valleys formed by glaciers.

Typically, a valley formed by glaciers has a series of basins with intervening steps formed by the locally varying erosion depths of valley glaciers. After the ice melts, this initially becomes a sequence of lakes with intermediate rapids or waterfalls. The transportation of gravels, erosion and sedimentation processes in the streams lead to the formation of sequences of flat valley bottoms and gorges.

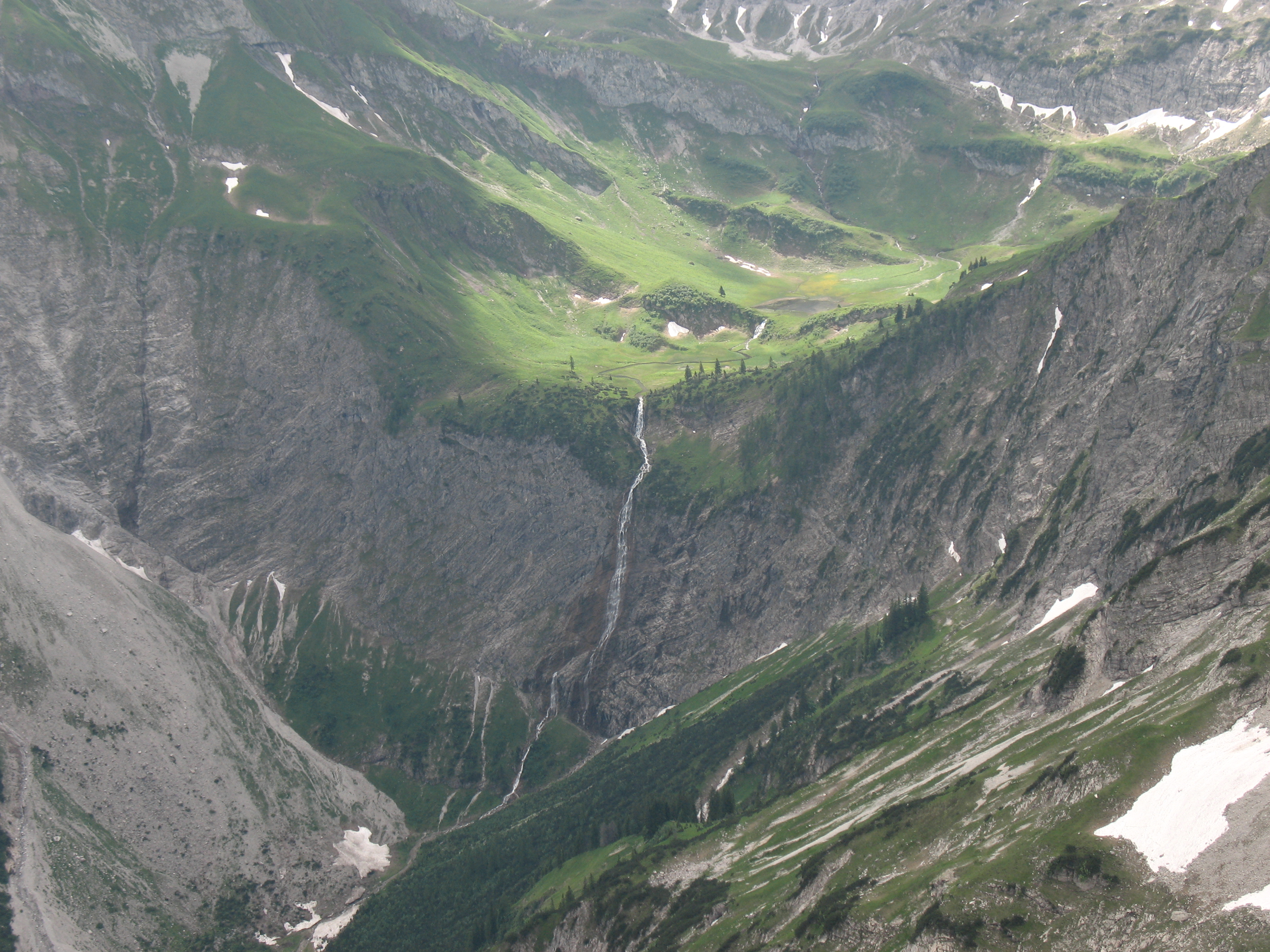
Typical valley step in a trough valley (Vilsalptal, Allgäu Alps). In the foreground its U-shape is almost filled in; behind is a gentle ravine

Such basin forms, with an abrupt beginning, often appear as marked steps, which may separate the flatter sections of the valley. Large steps were often formed where the erosion forces of the glacier that once filled the valley were suddenly increased, for instance, when large glaciers merged. They are then referred to as confluence steps. Similar steps are formed when moving sheets of ice merge into glacial streams, which can intensify surface scouring of the rocks (exaration). If these valley steps are close to the upper end of a valley, they are also referred to as a valley head or trough head; otherwise, they subdivide the course of the valley into often very distinct individual valley sections, with gentler and broader hollows alternating, chain-like, with and narrow intermediate valleys or gorges. In the interior of mountain ranges, these valleys dictate the structure of settlements, and may result in isolated communities that are difficult to access.

Side valleys, which rise high above the valley floor in a trough valley, also join the main valley at a marked step in the terrain, the stream descending over the valley wall of the main valley. This is referred to as a hanging valley, and the step is seen geomorphologically as the valley wall of the main valley, so it is not a valley stage in the narrow sense described above. Borderline cases are, for example, cirques, which typically form basins in which there is often a lake which either drains periodically over the valley threshold or seeps entirely into the subsoil.

Valley steps may also have existed before the glaciation of mountainous terrain or may be formed without the aid of glacial processes, typically due to varying erosion resistance of the rock, or due to active faults. These are then only accentuated by glacial and / or fluvial erosion. Examples of this are the tobel valleys in sandstones or, often only underground, draining troughs in the limestone, where the valley step is formed by downward erosion.

Valleys that were formed without the aid of glaciers are often found in the area of cuestas. These can then also create a very characteristic structure of a river course in its lower reaches on the broad plains and form a significant obstacle to navigation.

== Literature ==
- Stefan Rasemann: Geomorphometrische Struktur eines mesoskaligen alpinen Geosystems. Kapitel 2.3: Reliefformen des Hochgebirges. Dissertation Rheinische Friedrich–Wilhelms–Universität Bonn, 2003, p. 77 (pdf data; 3,95 MB)
