= Gunnar Hoppe =

Swedish geographer and Quaternary geologist

- Born: 24 December 1914
- Died: 24 January 2005 (aged 90)
- Known for: Veiki moraine
- Father: Carl Hoppe
- Awards: Vega Medal (1987)
- Scientific career
- Fields: Quaternary geology
- Workplaces: Stockholm University

Ernst Gunnar Hoppe (1914-2005) was a Swedish geographer and Quaternary geologist. He became a member of the Royal Swedish Academy of Sciences in 1964. At Stockholms högskola (as Stockholm University was known before it was granted university status in 1960) he succeeded Hans Wilhelmsson Ahlmann as professor of geography in 1954, holding that position until 1980. He was rector of Stockholm University from 1974 to 1978. In 2004, he obtained an honorary doctorate from the University of Iceland. Hoppe also was a member of the Bavarian Academy of Sciences and Humanities, the Academy of Sciences Leopoldina, Academia Europaea and the Polish Academy of Sciences.
