= Dead ice =

Glacial ice which is no longer moving

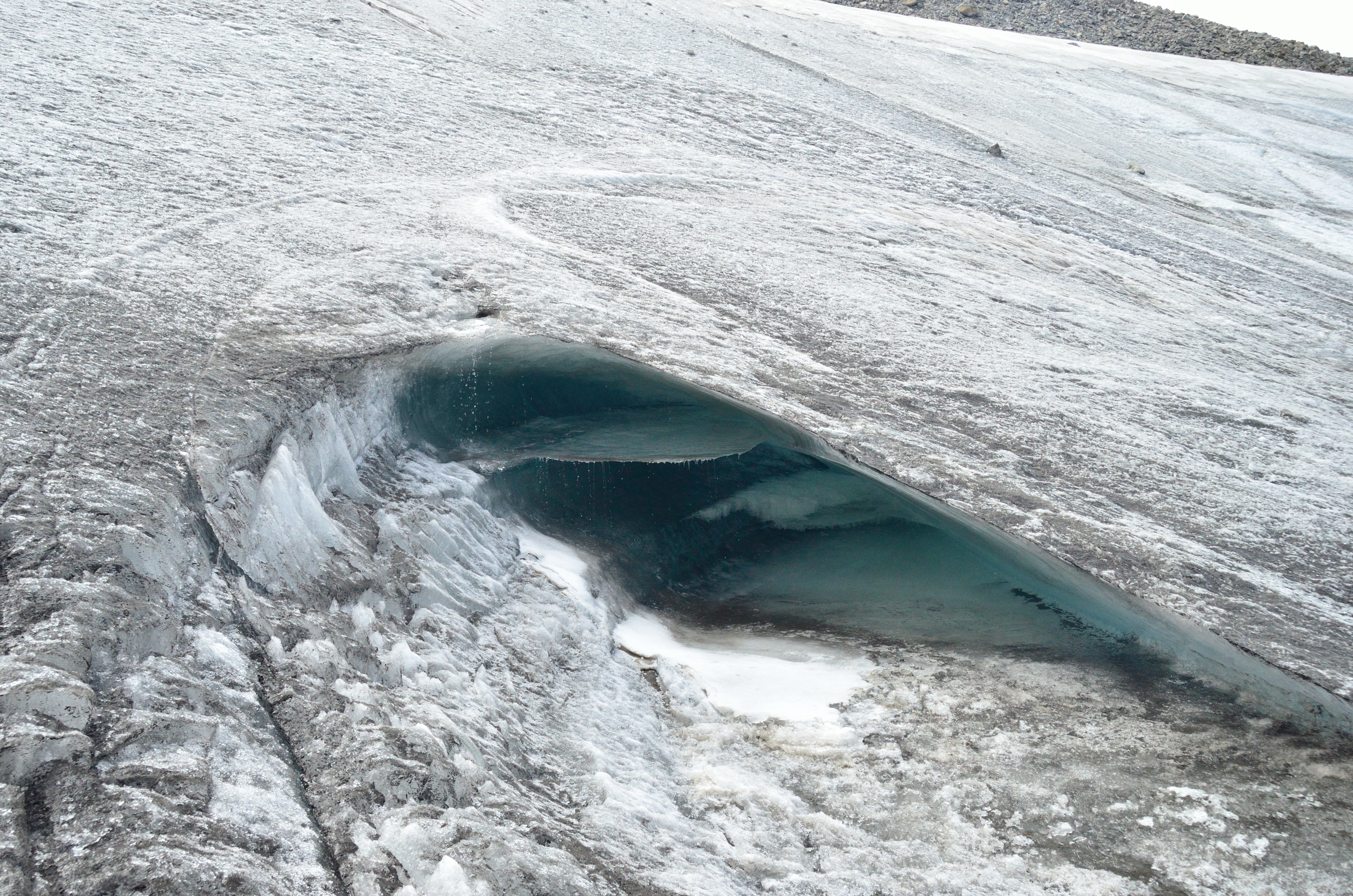
Dead Ice (transparent area) found in south of Hohe Geige; a mountain in Austria.

Dead ice is the ice in a part of a glacier or ice sheet that is no longer moving. As the ice melts, it leaves behind a hummocky terrain known as dead-ice moraine. Dead-ice moraine is produced by the accumulation of sediments carried by glaciers that have been left behind from ice melting. Features of such terrain include kettle holes. Landscapes forming Veiki moraines in northern Sweden and Canada have been attributed to the erosion of extensive bodies of till-covered dead ice.

== Formation ==
Dead ice is created when a glacier or ice sheet experiences an increase in melting and accumulates debris from various sediment sources. The debris seeps into the ice, effectively covering the surface area. This leads to the affected area becoming mixed with different types of debris, ultimately slowing the glacier's melting rate. This process continues over and over, creating layers of ice and debris, until it forms dead ice. Dead ice most commonly occurs on surge-type glaciers that have ceased moving. It can also be found in any stagnant or debris-filled glacier landforms.

== Melting ==
There are two types of ways dead ice can melt: backwasting and downwasting. Backwasting is when the dead ice melts parallel to an ice-wall or ice-cored slope. Backwasting is more likely to occur when an area is fully ice-cored. Downwasting is when dead ice melts at its top and bottom surfaces. Both dead ice melting rates depend on the climate condition of the area it is in; however downwasting has several other factors that contribute to its process. Another factor that affects both melting rates is the type of debris that covers the dead ice.
