= Veiki moraine =

Type of moraine

A Veiki moraine (Swedish: Veikimorän) is a type of moraine found in northern Sweden, Finnmark in Norway, and parts of Canada. This moraine is characterized by forming a hummocky landscape of irregular moraine plateaus with elevated rims that are intercalated with ponds. Gunnar Hoppe was the first to define the Veiki moraine concept in 1952, naming it after a locality consisting of two farms located about 10 kilometers north of Gällivare and Malmberget. To the east in Finnish Lapland, a moraine type similar to Veiki moraine but smaller is known as a Pulju moraine since 1967.

The disposition of the Veiki moraines reflects the last glacier movements before an ice sheet retreats, and their final form is given by the melting of dead ice and the development and sedimentation of glacial lagoons between dead-ice-cored rims during interstadial periods. In the case of the Veiki moraines of Sweden, the interstadial during which the lagoons sedimented is believed to have occurred in the early Weichsel glaciation. Thus, the Veiki moraines of Sweden are a relict landform that has largely survived later glacier action.

== See also ==
- Terminal moraine
- List of glacial moraines
