= Moraine =

Glacially formed accumulation of debris

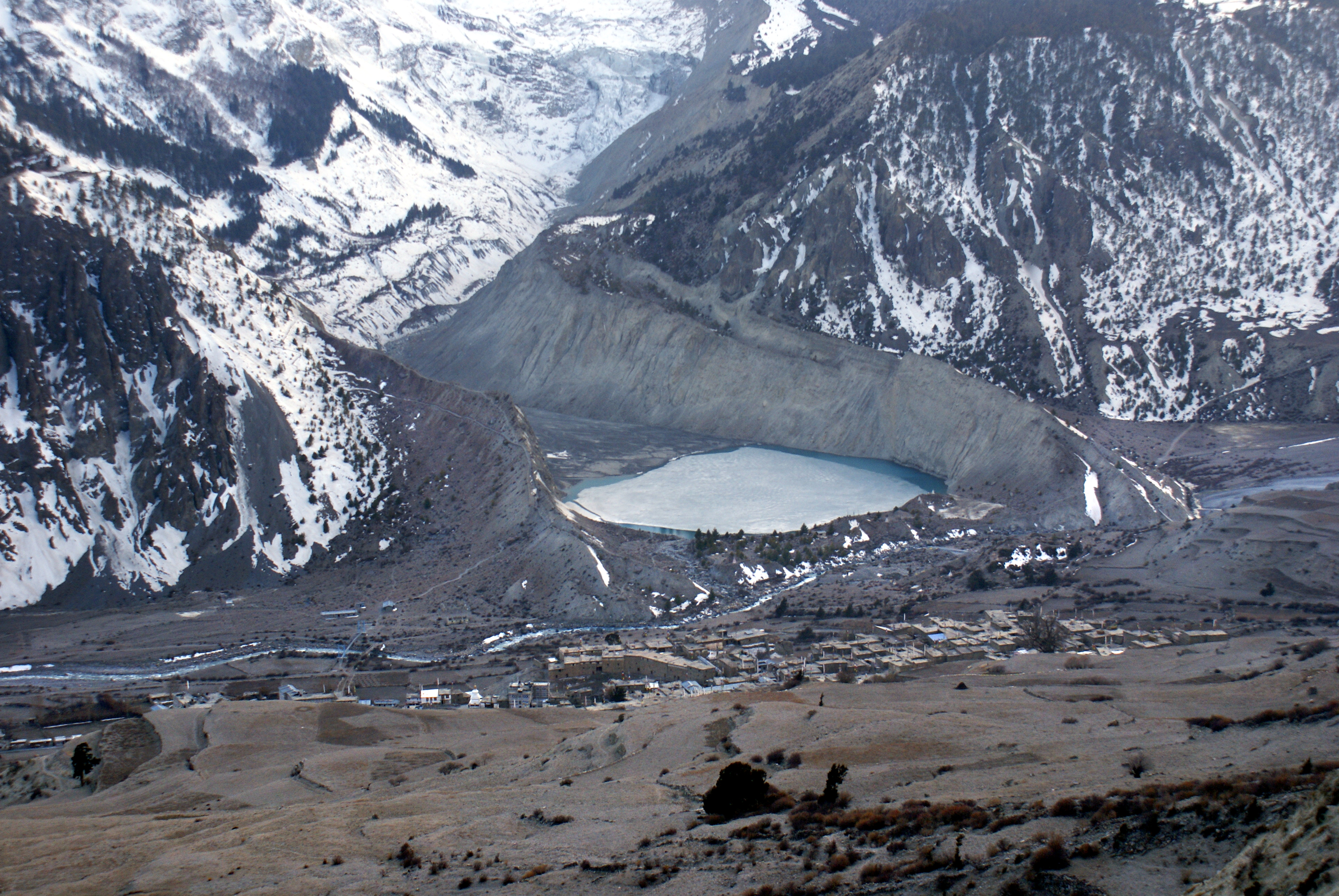
The snow-free debris hills around the lagoon are lateral and terminal moraines of a valley glacier in Manang, Nepal.

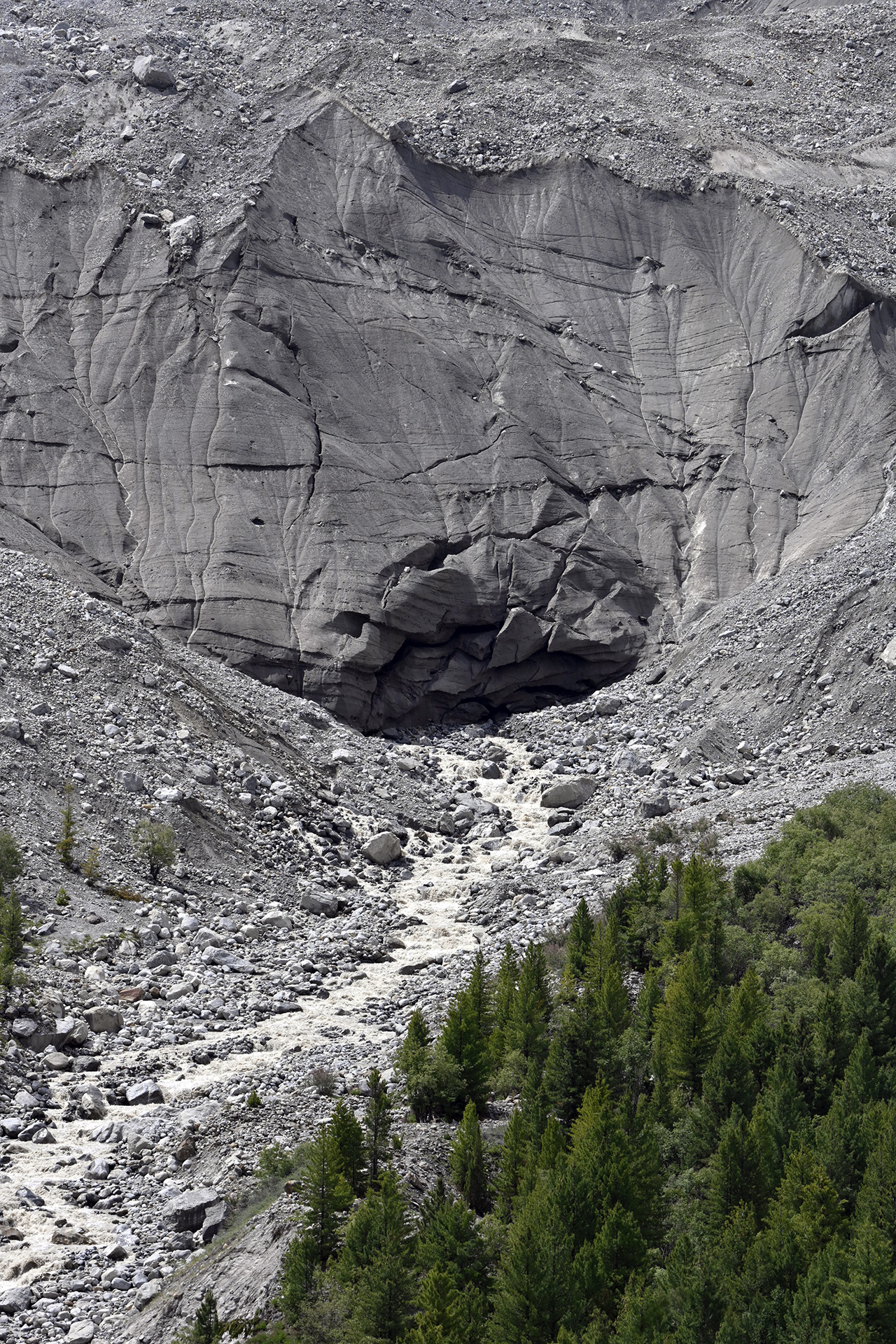
Moraine of the Nanga Parbat North Face Glacier as seen from Fairy Meadows, Pakistan

A moraine is any accumulation of unconsolidated debris (regolith and rock), sometimes referred to as glacial till, that occurs in both currently and formerly glaciated regions and that has been previously carried along by a glacier or ice sheet. It may consist of partly rounded particles ranging in size from boulders (in which case it is often referred to as boulder clay) down to gravel and sand, in a groundmass of finely divided clayey material sometimes called glacial flour. Lateral moraines are those formed at the side of the ice flow, and terminal moraines are those formed at the foot, marking the maximum advance of the glacier. Other types include ground moraines (till-covered areas forming sheets on flat or irregular topography) and medial moraines (formed where two glaciers meet).

== Etymology ==
The word moraine is borrowed from French moraine [mɔ.ʁɛn], which in turn is derived from the Savoyard Italian morena ('mound of earth'). Morena in this case was derived from Provençal morre ('snout'), itself from Vulgar Latin *murrum ('rounded object'). The term was introduced into geology by Horace Bénédict de Saussure in 1779.

== Characteristics ==
Moraines are landforms composed of glacial till deposited primarily by glacial ice. Glacial till is unstratified and unsorted debris ranging in size from silt-sized glacial flour to large boulders. The individual rock fragments are typically sub-angular to rounded in shape. Moraines may be found on the glacier's surface or deposited as piles or sheets of debris where the glacier has melted.

=== Formation ===
Moraines may form through a number of processes depending on the characteristics of sediment, the dynamics on the ice, and the location on the glacier in which the moraine is formed. Moraine forming processes may be loosely divided into passive and active.

Passive processes involve the placing of chaotic supraglacial sediments onto the landscape with limited reworking, typically forming hummocky moraines. These moraines are composed of supraglacial sediments from the ice surface.

Active processes form or rework moraine sediment directly by the movement of ice, known as glaciotectonism. These form push moraines and thrust-block moraines, which are often composed of till and reworked proglacial sediment.

Moraine may also form by the accumulation of sand and gravel deposits from glacial streams emanating from the ice margin. These fan deposits may coalesce to form a long moraine bank marking the ice margin. Several processes may combine to form and rework a single moraine, and most moraines record a continuum of processes. Reworking of moraines may lead to the formation of placer deposits of gold as is the case of southernmost Chile.

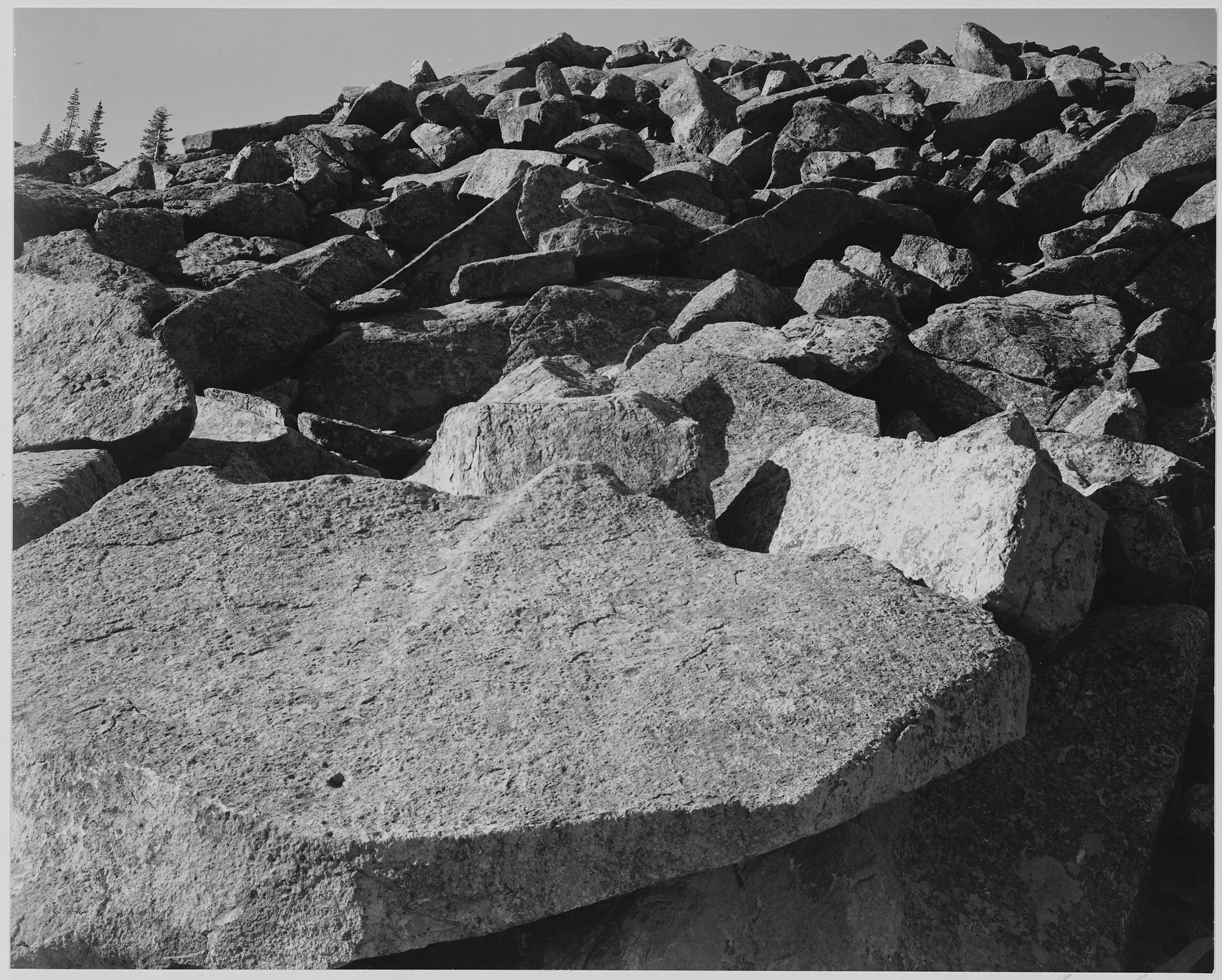
Moraine in Rocky Mountain National Park, taken by Ansel Adams in 1941

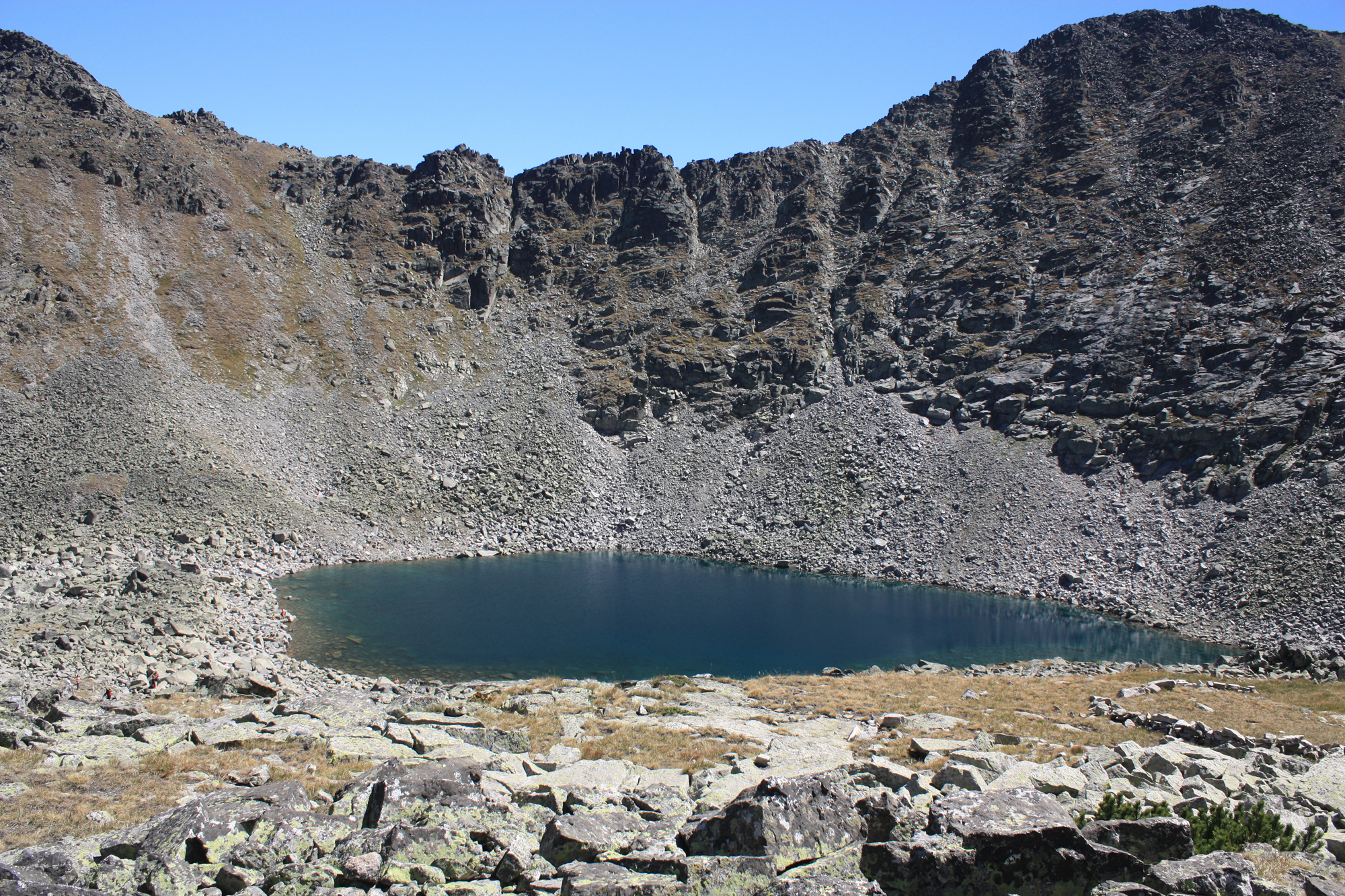
Moraines around Icy lake (2709 m), just below Musala peak (2925 m) in Rila Mountain, Bulgaria

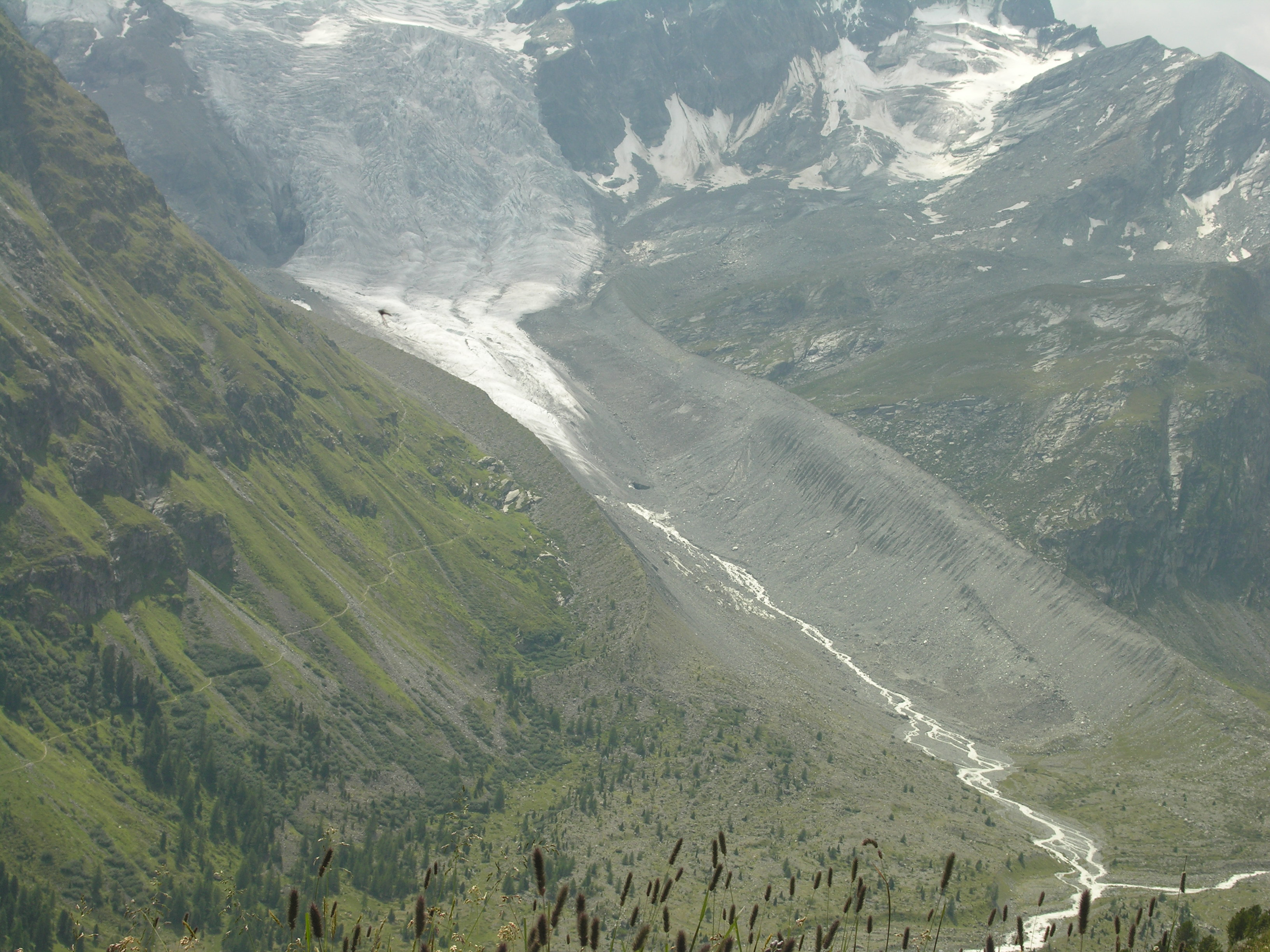
Lateral moraines of a retreating glacier in Engadin in Switzerland

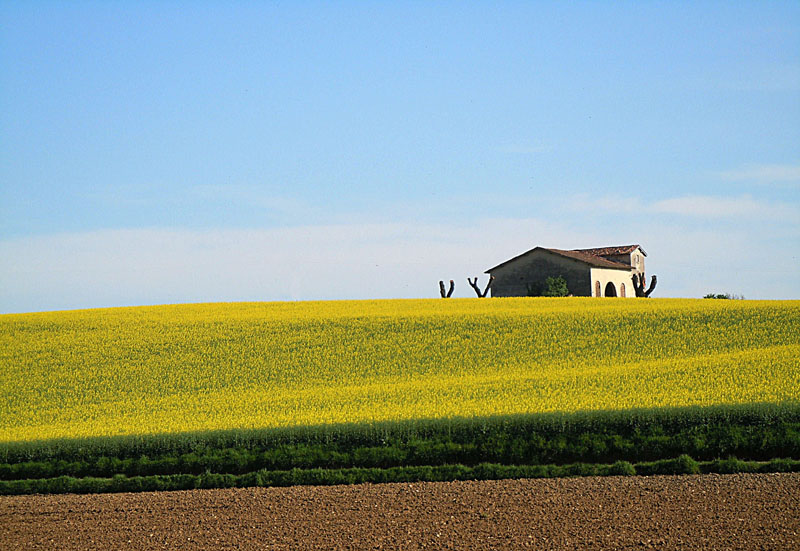
Moraine of Lake Garda in Italy

== Types ==
Moraines can be classified either by origin, location with respect to a glacier or former glacier, or by shape. The first approach is suitable for moraines associated with contemporary glaciers—but more difficult to apply to old moraines, which are defined by their particular morphology, since their origin is debated. Some moraine types are known only from ancient glaciers, while medial moraines of valley glaciers are poorly preserved and difficult to distinguish after the retreat or melting of the glacier.

=== Lateral moraine ===
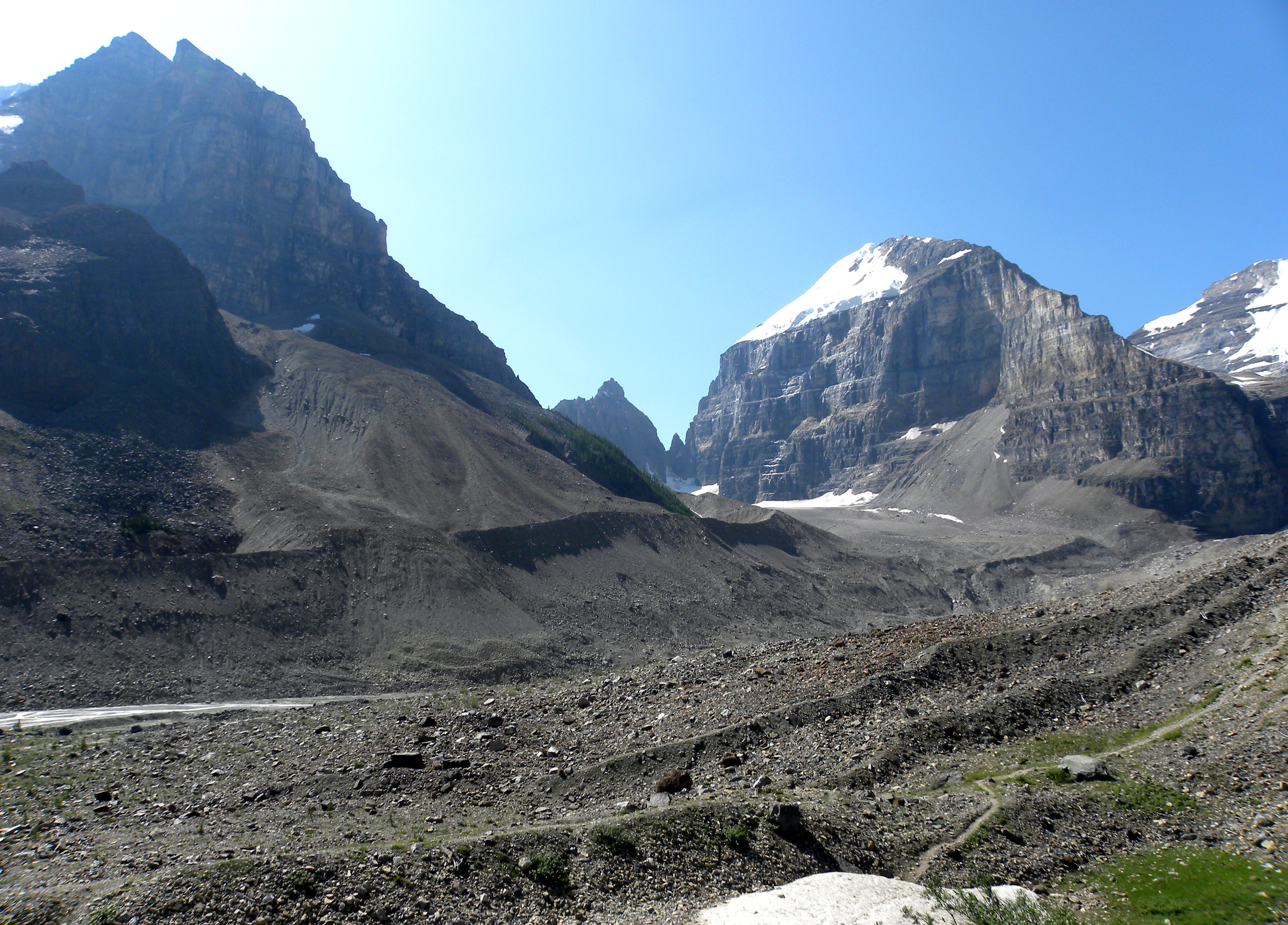
Lateral moraines above Lake Louise, Alberta, Canada

Lateral moraines are parallel ridges of debris deposited along the sides of a glacier. The unconsolidated debris can be deposited on top of the glacier by frost shattering of the valley walls or from tributary streams flowing into the valley, or may be subglacial debris carried to the surface of the glacier, melted out, and transported to the glacier margin.

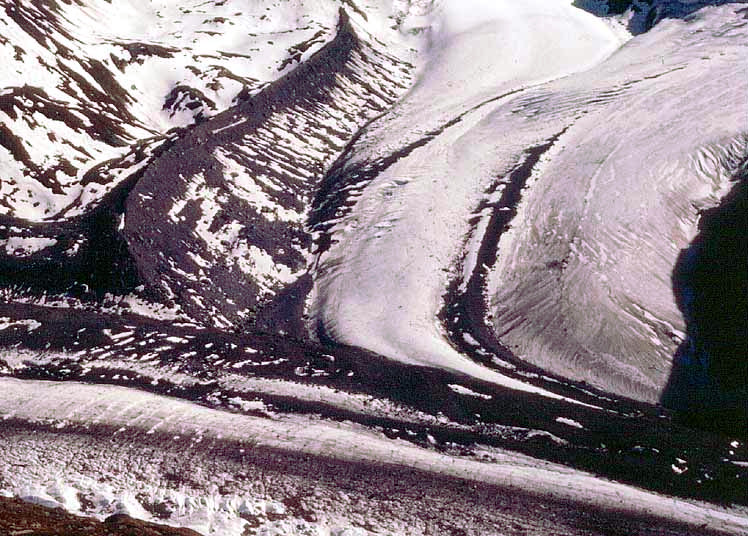
Moraines clearly seen on a side glacier of the Gorner Glacier, Zermatt, Switzerland. The lateral moraine is the high snow-free bank of debris in the top left hand quarter of the picture. The medial moraine is the double line of debris running down the centre-line of the glacier.

Lateral moraines can rise up to 140 meters (460 ft) over the valley floor, can be up to three kilometers (2 mi) long, and are steeper close to the glacier margin (up to 80 degrees) than further away (where slopes are typically 29 to 36 degrees).

=== Ground moraine ===
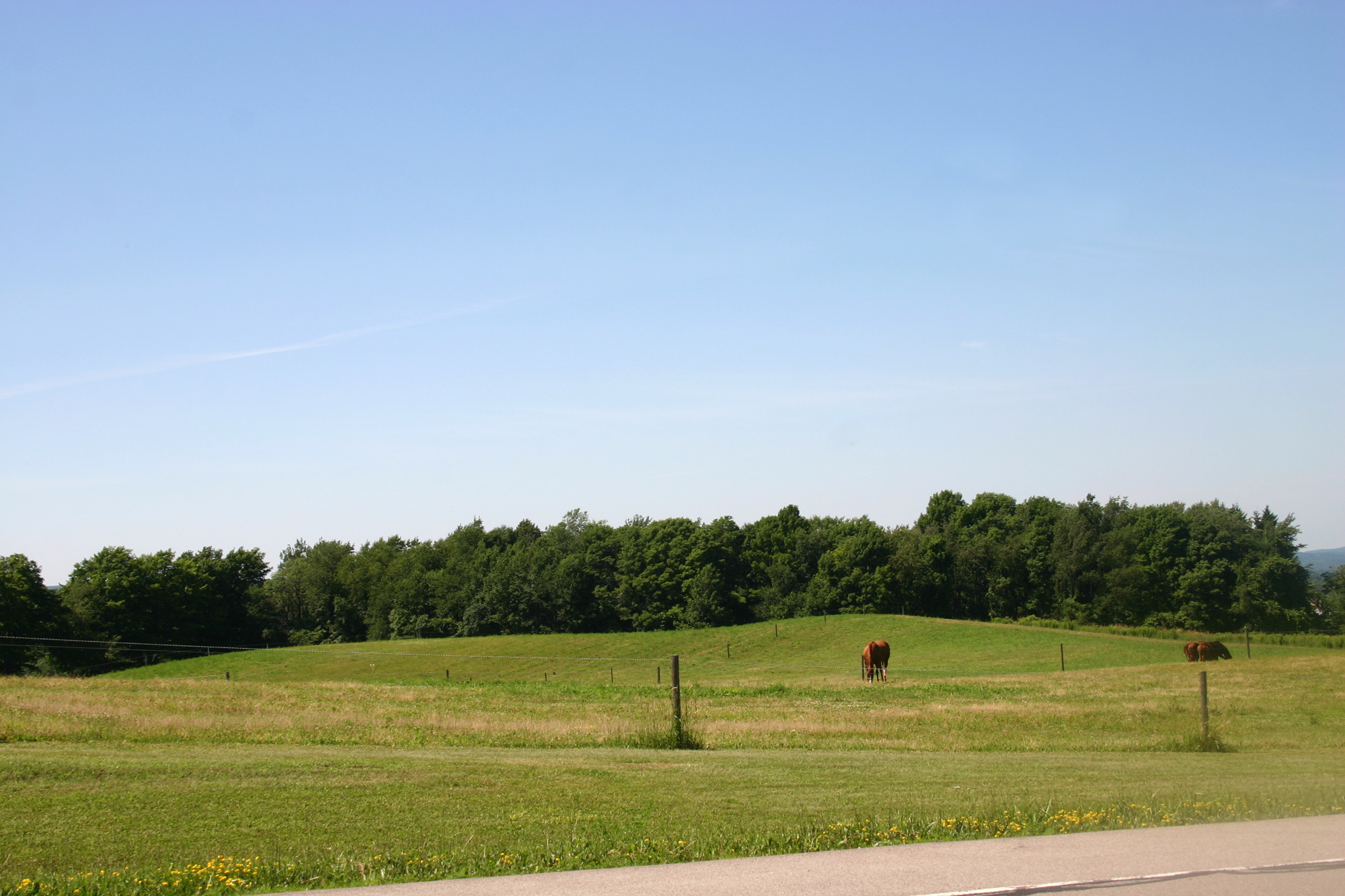
Ground moraines create irregular, rolling topography near Gainesville, New York.

Ground moraines are till-covered areas with irregular topography and no ridges, often forming gently rolling hills or plains, with relief of less than 10 meters (33 ft). Ground moraine is accumulated at the base of the ice as lodgment till with a thin and discontinuous upper layer of supraglacial till deposited as the glacier retreats. It typically is found in the areas between end moraines.

==== Rogen moraine ====
Rogen moraines or ribbed moraines are a type of basal moraines that form a series of ribs perpendicular to the ice flow in an ice sheet. The depressions between the ribs are sometimes filled with water, making the Rogen moraines look like tiger stripes on aerial photographs. Rogen moraines are named after Lake Rogen in Härjedalen, Sweden, the landform's type locality.

==== de Geer moraine ====
Closely related to Rogen moraines, de Geer moraines are till ridges up to 5 m high and 10–50 m wide running perpendicular to the ice flow. They occur in large groups in low-lying areas. Named for Gerard De Geer who first described them in 1889, these moraines may have developed from crevasses underneath the ice sheet. The Kvarken has a high density of de Geer moraines.

=== End or terminal moraine ===
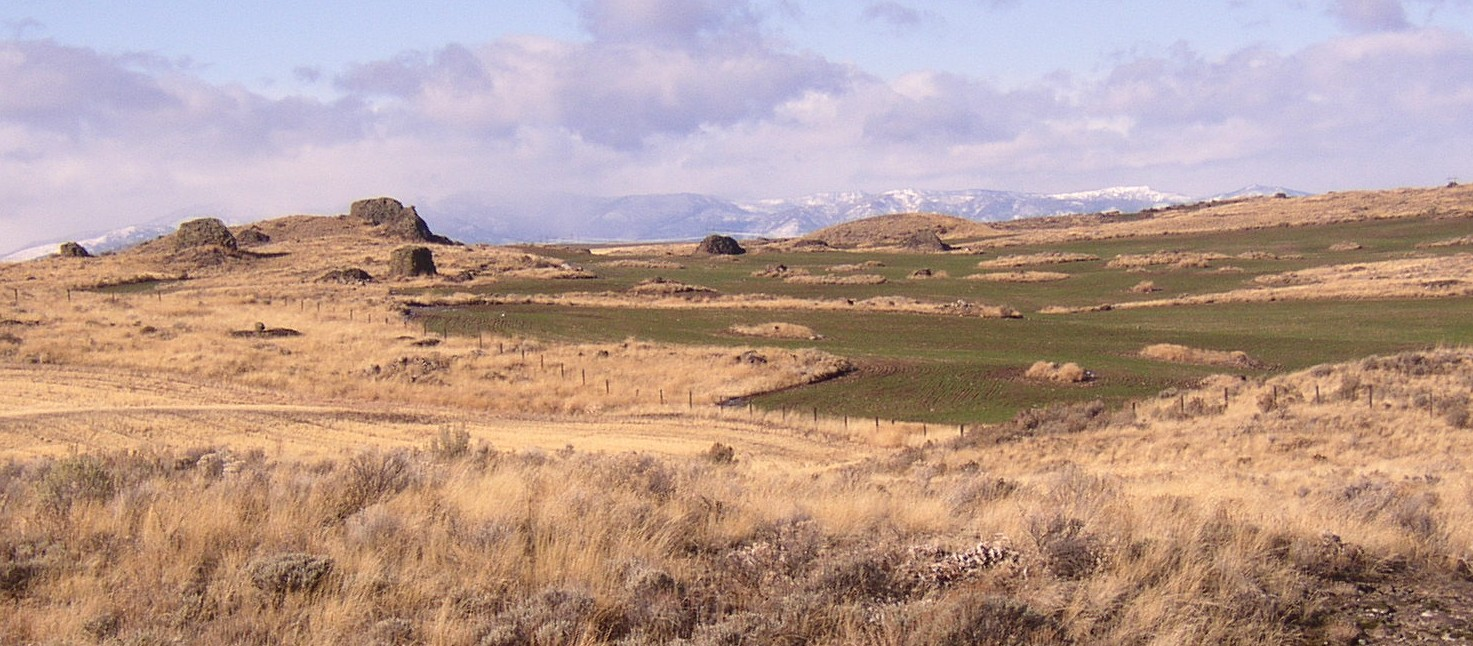
Multiple erratics on the Withrow terminal moraine of the Okanogan Lobe. Cascade Mountains in the background.

End moraines, or terminal moraines, are ridges of unconsolidated debris deposited at the snout or end of the glacier. They usually reflect the shape of the glacier's terminus. Glaciers act much like a conveyor belt, carrying debris from the top of the glacier to the bottom where it deposits it in end moraines. End moraine size and shape are determined by whether the glacier is advancing, receding or at equilibrium. The longer the terminus of the glacier stays in one place, the more debris accumulate in the moraine. There are two types of end moraines: terminal and recessional. Terminal moraines mark the maximum advance of the glacier. Recessional moraines are small ridges left as a glacier pauses during its retreat. After a glacier retreats, the end moraine may be destroyed by postglacial erosion.

==== Recessional moraine ====
Recessional moraines are often observed as a series of transverse ridges running across a valley behind a terminal moraine. They form perpendicular to the lateral moraines that they reside between and are composed of unconsolidated debris deposited by the glacier. They are created during temporary halts in a glacier's retreat.

==== Arctic push moraine ====
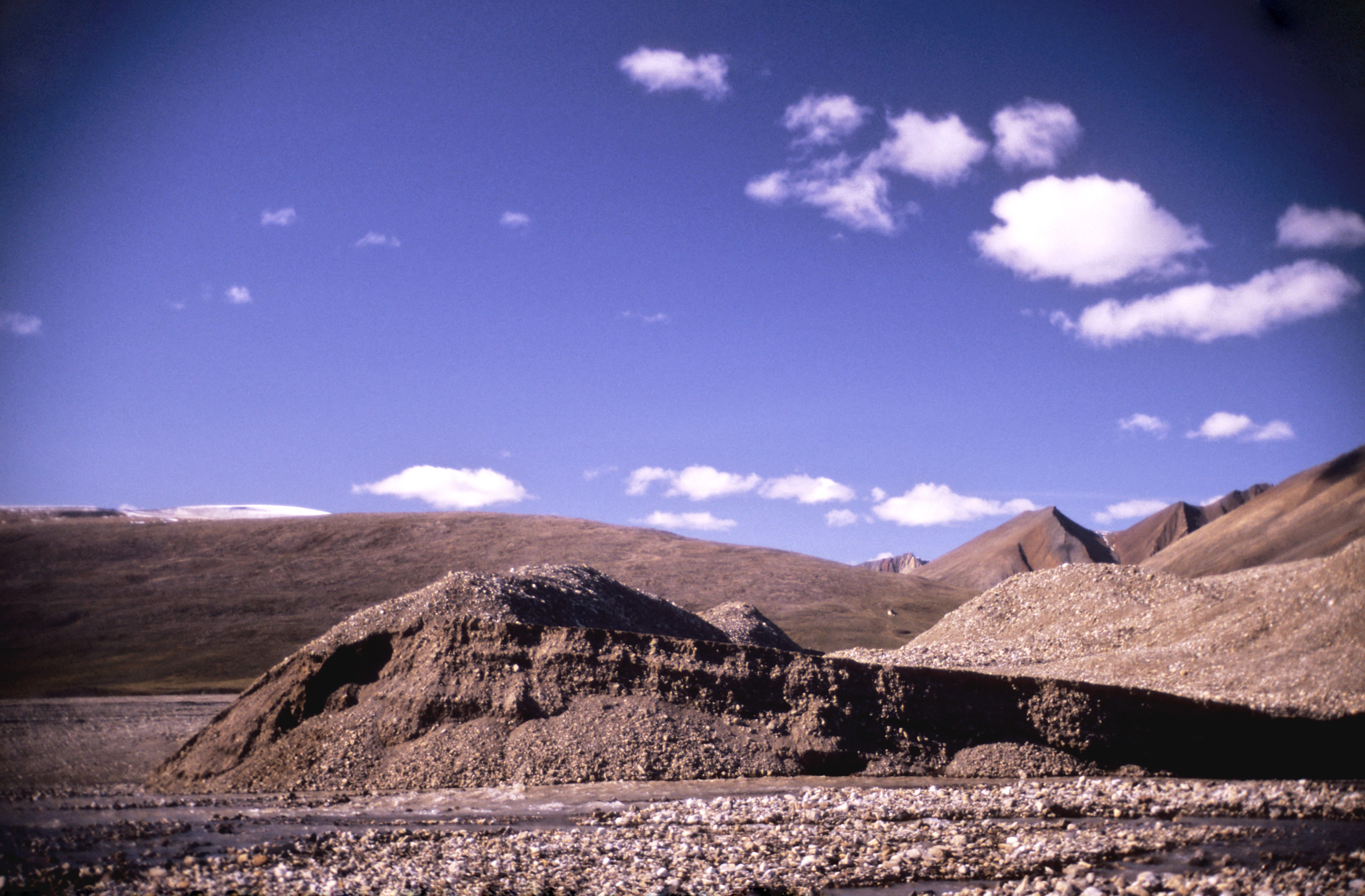
Arctic push moraine in northern Ellesmere Island, Grant Land

In permafrost areas an advancing glacier may push up thick layers of frozen sediments at its front. An arctic push moraine will then be formed.

=== Medial moraine ===
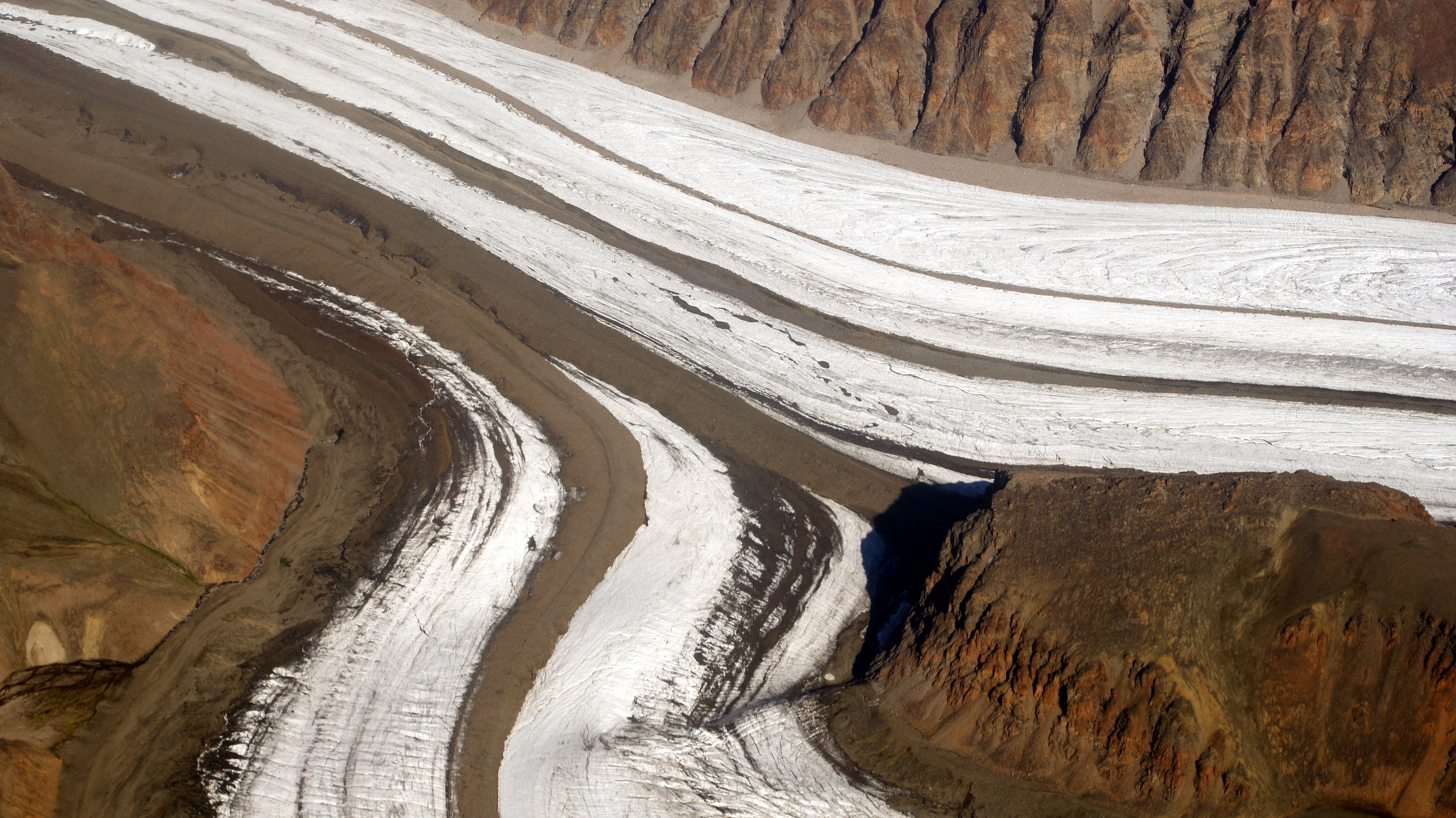
Medial moraines, Nuussuaq Peninsula, Greenland

A medial moraine is a ridge of moraine that runs down the center of a valley floor. It forms when two glaciers meet and the debris on the edges of the adjacent valley sides join and are carried on top of the enlarged glacier. As the glacier melts or retreats, the debris is deposited and a ridge down the middle of the valley floor is created. The Kaskawulsh Glacier in the Kluane National Park, Yukon, has a ridge of medial moraine 1 km wide.

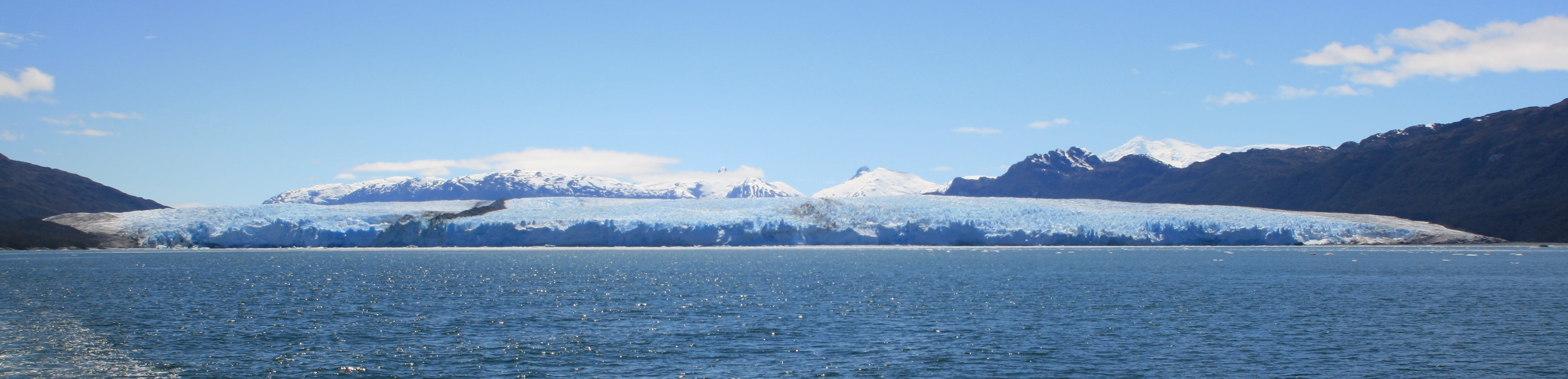
The prominent dark streak at the left quarter is forming a medial moraine.
This is seen as a mudflat at the water's surface. (Brüggen Glacier, Patagonia).

=== Supraglacial moraine ===
Supraglacial moraines are created by debris accumulated on top of glacial ice. This debris can accumulate due to ice flow toward the surface in the ablation zone, melting of surface ice or from debris that falls onto the glacier from valley sidewalls.

=== Washboard moraine ===
Washboard moraines, also known as minor or corrugated moraines, are low-amplitude geomorphic features caused by glaciers. They consist of low-relief ridges, 1 to 2 meters (3 ft 3 in to 6 ft 7 in) in height and around 100 meters (330 ft) apart, accumulated at the base of the ice as lodgment till. The name refers to the fact that from the air it resembles a washboard.

=== Veiki moraine ===
A Veiki moraine is a kind of hummocky moraine that forms irregular landscapes of ponds and plateaus surrounded by banks. It forms from the irregular melting of ice covered with a thick layer of debris. Veiki moraine is common in northern Sweden and parts of Canada.

== See also ==
Geologic features related to moraines
- Glacial landform – Landform created by the action of glaciers
- Drumlin – Elongated hill formed by glacial action
- Esker – Long, winding ridge of stratified sand and gravel associated with former glaciers
- Moraine-dammed lake – Type of lake formed by glaciation
- Kame
Examples
- Dogger Bank – Large sandbank in the North Sea
- Kettle Moraine – Large moraine in Wisconsin
- Long Island – Populous island in southeastern New York State
- Oak Ridges Moraine – Glacial till landform above Lake Ontario, Canada
- Valparaiso Moraine – Moraine in the midwestern United States
- Cypress Hills (Canada) – Hills in Alberta and Saskatchewan, Canada
- Sleeping Bear Dunes National Lakeshore – Protected area in Michigan, United States
