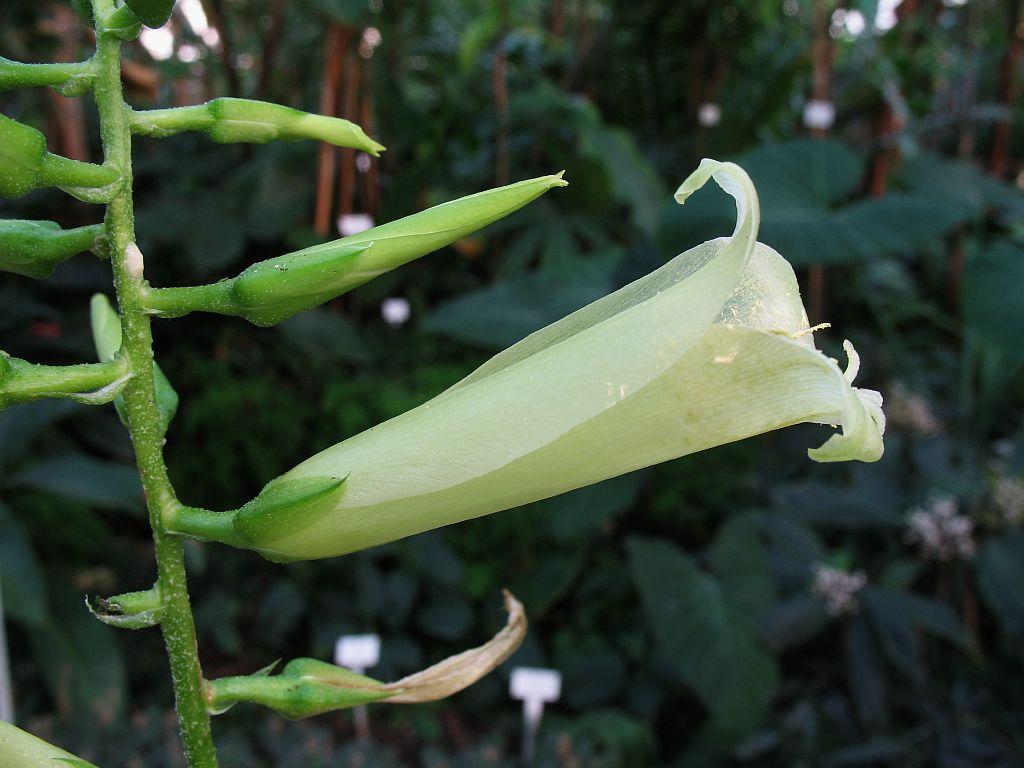
- Pitcairnia loki-schmidtiae type plant in cultivation at the Botanical Garden of Heidelberg, Germany.

Scientific classification
- Kingdom: Plantae
- Clade: Tracheophytes
- Clade: Angiosperms
- Clade: Monocots
- Clade: Commelinids
- Order: Poales
- Family: Bromeliaceae
- Genus: Pitcairnia
- Species: P. loki-schmidtiae

Binomial name
- Pitcairnia loki-schmidtiae Barthlott & Rauh

= Pitcairnia loki-schmidtiae =

Species of flowering plant

Pitcairnia loki-schmidtiae is a plant species in the genus Pitcairnia. This species is endemic to Mexico.

The species is named after Hannelore "Loki" Schmidt, wife of former German chancellor Helmut Schmidt. Mrs. Schmidt discovered the species during a 1985 educational journey to Mexico.
