= Poppenbüttler Graben =

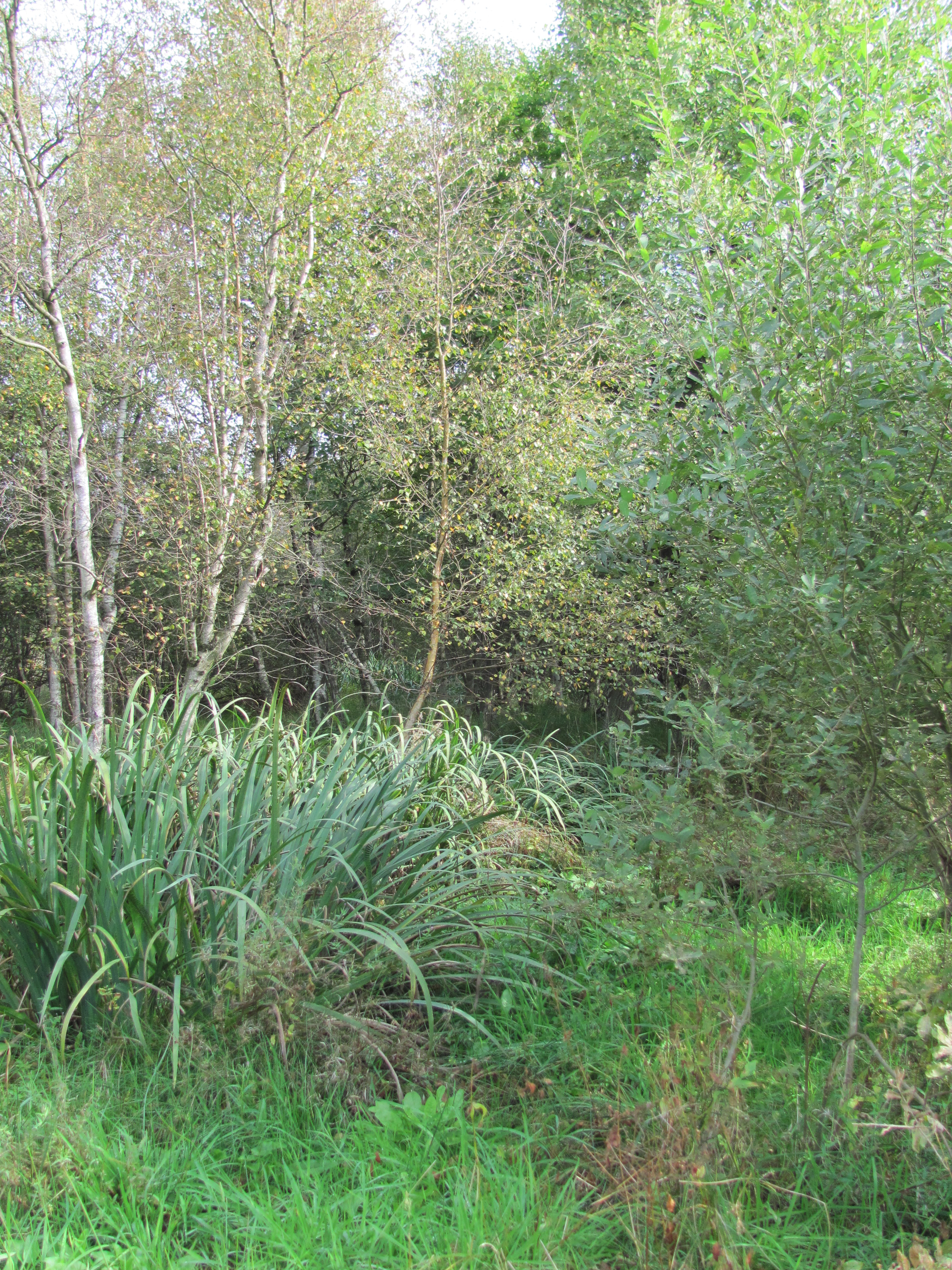
Poppenbüttler Graben.

The Poppenbüttler Graben is a small bog in the borough of Hamburg, which is one of the natural monuments of the city. It runs parallel to Kupferteichweg road in Poppenbüttel. The bog is not accessible on paths. It drains into the Mellingbek stream.

== Flora ==
Among the plants that have colonised the bog are rushes, marsh gentian, bog asphodel, cranberries, sundew, sedges and lousewort. Three flowers that occur in the Poppenbüttler Graben have been named as the Flower of the Year Campaign in Germany: the marsh gentian (1980), the common sundew (1992) and the bog asphodel (2011).
