= Federal Chancellor Helmut Schmidt Foundation =

German foundation

- Bundeskanzler-Helmut-Schmidt-Stiftung
- Abbreviation: BKHS
- Named after: Helmut Schmidt
- Established: January 1, 2017; 9 years ago
- Legal status: Foundation of public law
- Purpose: Preserving the memory of Helmut Schmidt's political work; political education
- Location: Hamburg, Germany
- Chairman: Meik Woyke
- Trustees: Peer Steinbrück (Chair)
- Staff: 41
- Website: helmut-schmidt.de/en/

The Federal Chancellor Helmut Schmidt Foundation (German: Bundeskanzler-Helmut-Schmidt-Stiftung, Abbr. BKHS) is the most recent of the seven non-partisan foundations commemorating politicians in Germany. It was established on 1 January 2017 by the German Bundestag to "preserve the memory of Helmut Schmidt's political work for the freedom and unity of the German people, for European freedom and unification and for understanding and reconciliation among nations". Within the framework of its political education work, it is also tasked with conveying to young people in particular those topics that exercised Schmidt as a politician and journalist.

The foundation has its headquarters in central Hamburg and a branch office in Schmidt's former home in the Langenhorn district of the city, where the private Helmut Schmidt Archives are also located.

== Organisation ==
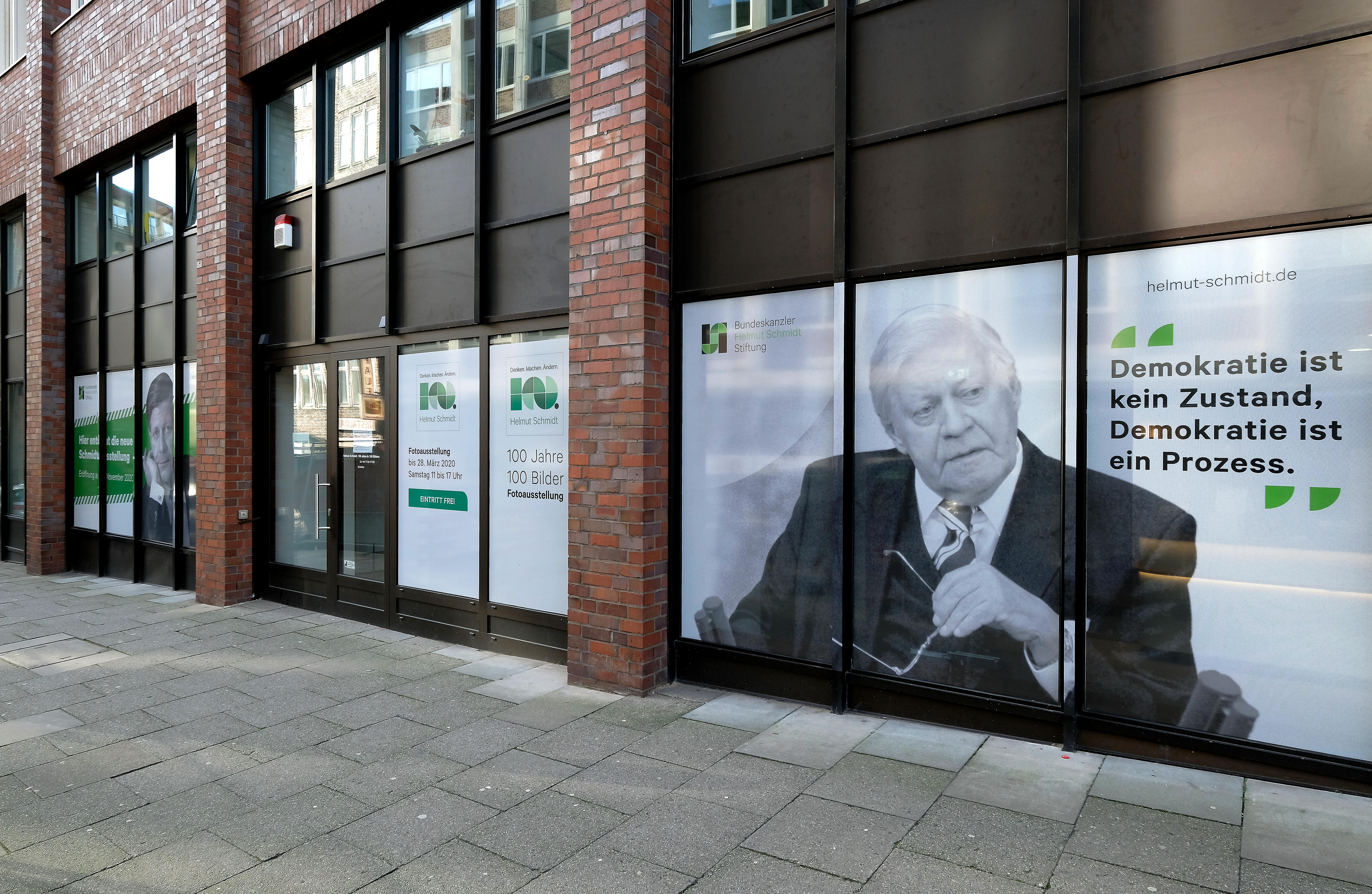
Headquarters of the foundation in central Hamburg (Kattrepel 10)

The BKHS is a foundation in public law under direct federal government control. It is funded by grants from the federal budget and is subject to legal supervision by the Federal Government Commissioner for Culture and the Media (BKM).

The bodies of the foundation are the Board of Trustees, whose members are appointed for a period of five years by the Federal President, and the management board appointed by the Trustees. The Board of Trustees currently comprises Peer Steinbrück (chair), Matthias Naß, Katrin Budde, Herlind Gundelach, Johannes Kahrs and Constanze Stelzenmüller. Deputies are Niels Annen, Edelgard Bulmahn, Manuel Hartung, Olaf Schulz-Gardyan and Katja Suding.

The historian Meik Woyke has been chairman of the management board and managing director since 1 July 2019. Further, honorary members of the board are Rainer Schulz and Bernd Neuendorf. From 2017 to 2019, Stefan Herms and Knut Nevermann managed the foundation's business as honorary board members.

== Tasks ==
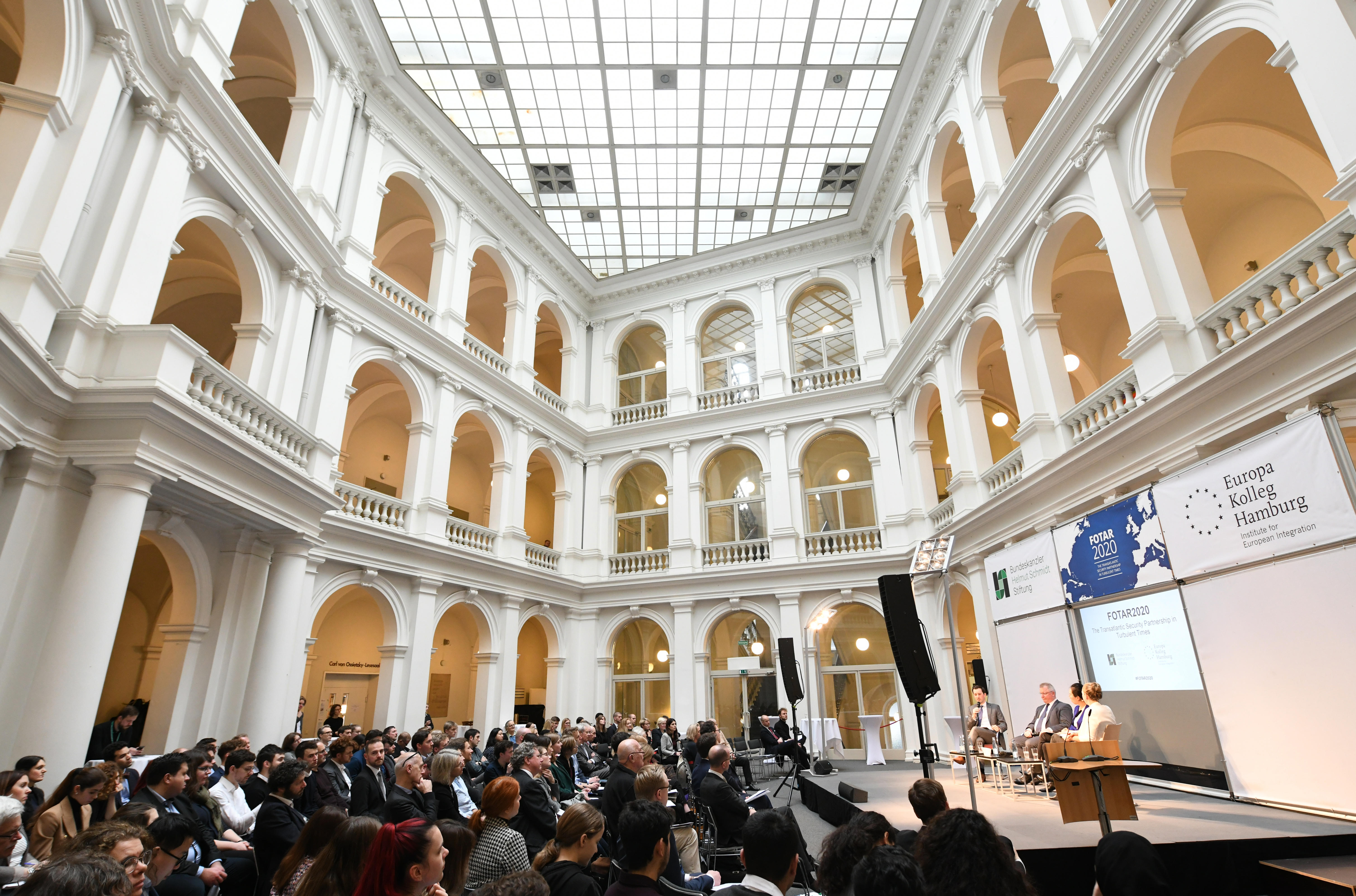
Participants at a BKHS conference in the atrium of the Hamburg State and University Library in January 2020

According to the law establishing it, the foundation shall

1. make a contribution to the understanding of contemporary history and the continued development of the Federal Republic of Germany and
2. to the reappraisal, presentation and further development of Germany's responsibilities in foreign, security and economic policy in a European and global setting.
3. It shall also contribute to deepening and broadening knowledge of 21st century geopolitical and economic challenges in Europe and the world.

In addition to the historical work, there are three sub-programmes: "European and International Politics", "Global Markets and Social Justice" and "Democracy and Society". They take up thematic impulses in Helmut Schmidt's life and address current political issues. A particular focus is on the future of transatlantic relations: In this regard, the foundation has already staged several symposiums and, in cooperation with the German Marshall Fund, established a high-ranking commission of experts charged with making recommendations by the autumn of 2020. This "Transatlantic Task Force" includes European and US experts such as Catherine Ashton, Cecilia Malmström, Will Hurd, Elissa Slotkin, Henrik Enderlein, or Michael Froman. It is chaired by President of the German Marshall Fund Karen Donfried and German diplomat Wolfgang Ischinger.

The foundation organised the first Future of Transatlantic Relations (FOTAR) conference in 2018. Since then, the conference has been held every two years.

The BKHS also publishes its own series of policy briefs - BKHS-Blickwinkel or BKHS Perspective - with current policy recommendations.

Since 2021, the Helmut Schmidt Lecture has been held annually in Berlin on the anniversary of Helmut Schmidt's death (10 November). On this occasion, the Foundation invites an outstanding public figure as a "thought leader of today" to speak about a topic that already shaped Schmidt's life and that has not lost its relevance today. First speaker in 2021 was Sviatlana Tsikhanouskaya, in 2022 Hatice Cengiz, 2023 Moritz Schularick, in 2024 Ekrem İmamoğlu.

Together with the weekly newspaper Die Zeit and The New Institute, the Foundation annually awards the Helmut Schmidt Future Prize since 2022. This award honours an international personality for his or her innovative achievements in the fields of democracy, society and technology.

The foundation works closely with the private Helmut and Loki Schmidt Foundation (HLS), established in 1992, and also on archive matters with the Friedrich Ebert Foundation and the German Federal Archives.

== Locations ==
=== Helmut Schmidt Forum ===
At its headquarters in central Hamburg, the foundation maintains the Helmut Schmidt Forum, where exhibitions and guided tours are offered as well as regular readings, lectures and discussions. On 7 December 2018, the first exhibition, "100 years in 100 days" opened, showing one image for each year of the former Chancellor's life, including some previously unpublished photographs, up until the end of March 2020.

For 10 November 2020, the fifth anniversary of Schmidt's death, the ceremonial opening of the permanent exhibition "Schmidt! Living Democracy" was planned, which was not possible due to the Covid pandemic. On a small scale, the exhibition - still under the conditions of the pandemic - opened its doors to the public on 19 June 2021. The show provides insights into a century of German and international contemporary history and sheds light on conflict issues (still relevant today), especially from the 1970s and 1980s. Guests are invited to discuss and ask questions about the future of democracy in Germany, Europe and the world.

=== House in Langenhorn ===
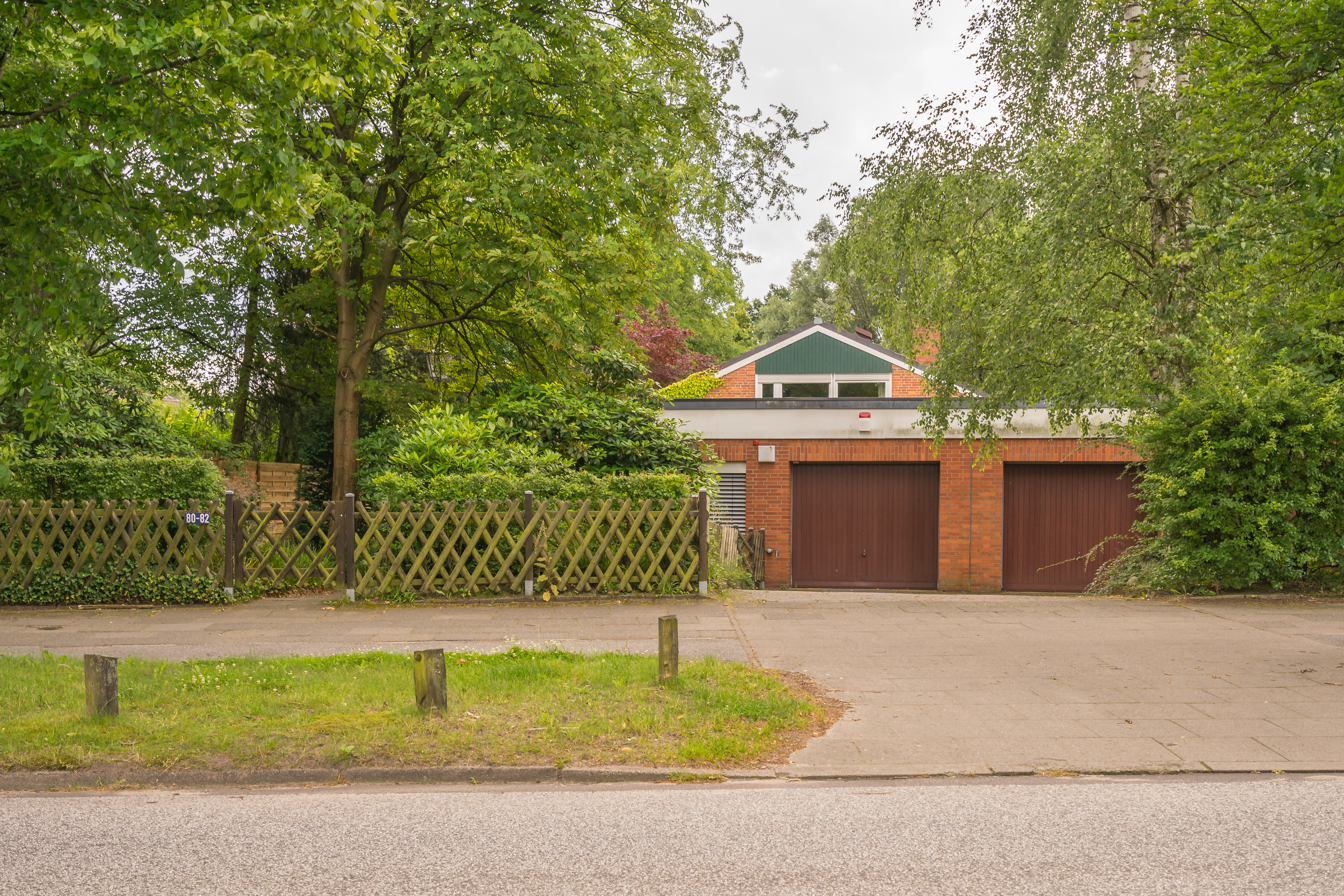
Schmidt's house in Langenhorn, viewed from the street

In December 1961, Helmut and Loki Schmidt and their daughter Susanne moved into a house in the Langenhorn district of Hamburg. Here, Helmut Schmidt played host to friends, politicians and artists. His guests included Valéry Giscard d'Estaing, Henry Kissinger, Juan Carlos I of Spain, Leonid Brezhnev, Oskar Kokoschka and the members of the "Friday Society" that Schmidt founded.

After Schmidt's death on 10 November 2015, the private Helmut and Loki Schmidt Foundation (HLS), established back in 1992, inherited the property from the couple with the task of preserving it as an authentic historical site. Due to space constraints, guided tours here are only possible to a limited extent. They are offered exclusively through the BKHS.

=== Helmut Schmidt Archives ===
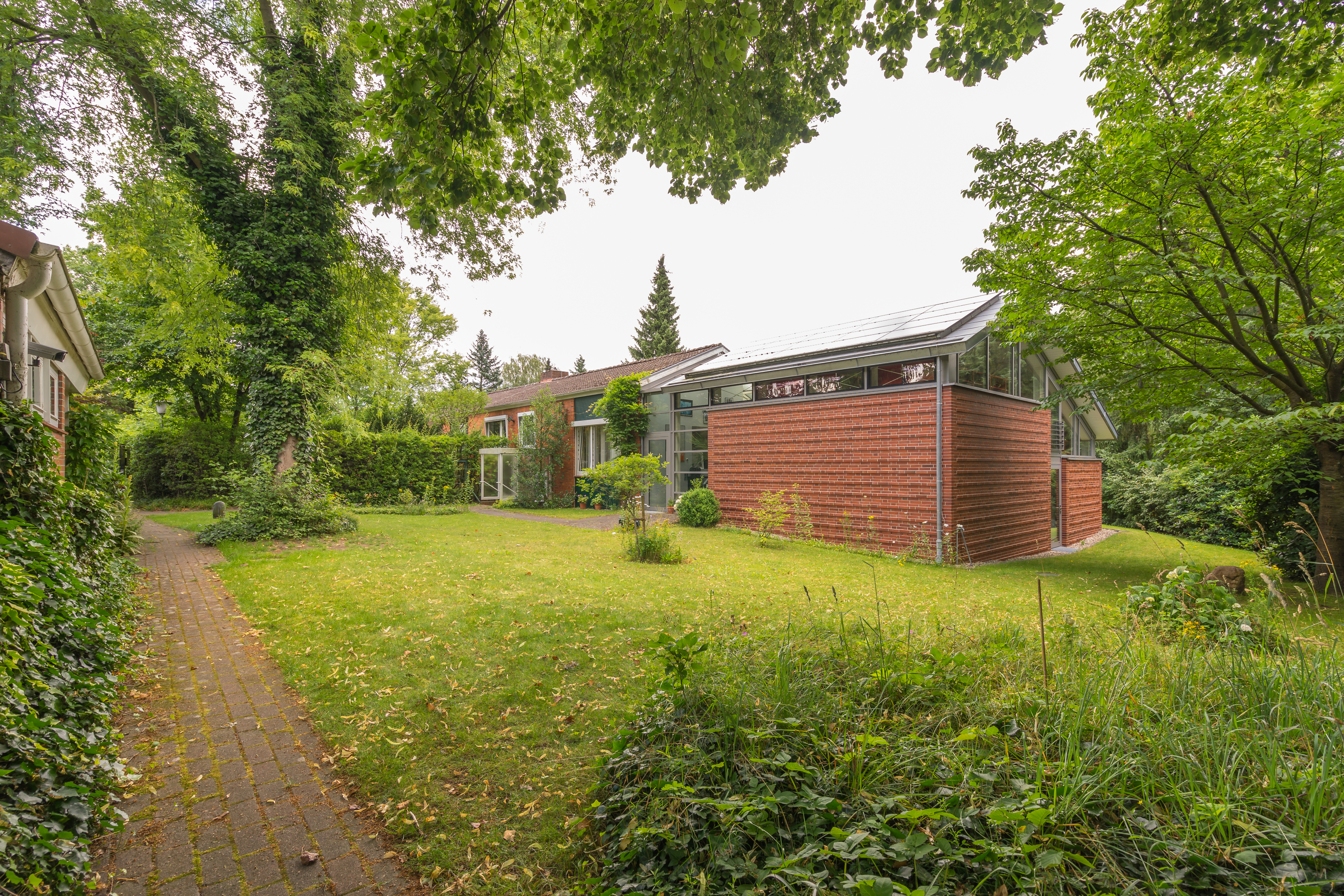
Annexe for the Helmut Schmidt Archives in Langenhorn

Also in Langenhorn are the Helmut Schmidt Archives that house the private papers of Helmut and Loki Schmidt, their close friend Karl Wilhelm Berkhan and of Helmut Schmidt's brother, Wolfgang Schmidt (1921–2006). They comprise more than 3,500 individual documents, 284 photo albums and a comprehensive library. Schmidt had already had a small library built in 1978, and in 1992 the couple acquired the semi-detached house next door to house the archives. In 2006/7 a further annexe was added. Since then the bequests have been housed in a separate storeroom.

The archives also belong to the private Helmut and Loki Schmidt Foundation. BKHS staff work to index and record the bequests stored here, thus creating the conditions for their public use.
