= Constanze Stelzenmüller =

German international affairs analyst

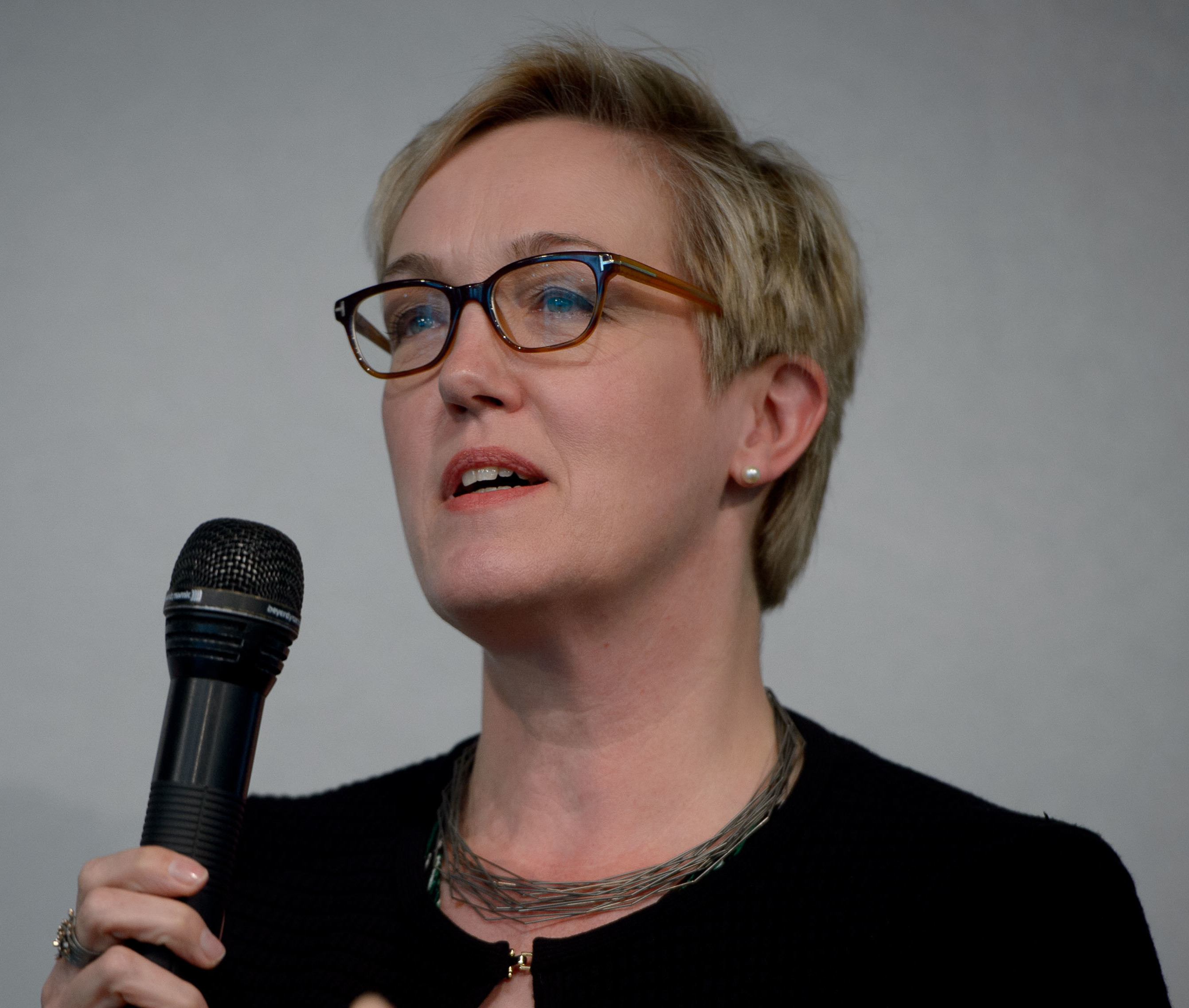
- Education: University of Bonn; Harvard Kennedy School
- Scientific career
- Fields: Political science
- Workplaces: Der Tagesspiegel; Die Zeit; German Marshall Fund; Brookings Institution; Library of Congress

Constanze Stelzenmüller is a German international relations analyst, policy and law scholar, and journalist. She is an expert in German, European, and transatlantic foreign policy and global affairs. She writes academic and journalistic analyses in English and German media about international relations in general, and German–American relations in particular, as well as questions in the politics of Germany and the United States.

== Career ==
Stelzenmüller studied law at the University of Geneva and the University of Bonn, where she graduated in 1985. In 1988, she was a McCloy Fellow (de) and completed a master's degree in public administration at the Harvard Kennedy School. She then worked as a visiting scholar at Harvard Law School for a year, after which she obtained a doctorate from the University of Bonn in 1992. Her thesis, called Direkte Demokratie in den Vereinigten Staaten von Amerika, was a study of direct democracy in the United States.

From 1992 to 1994, Stelzenmüller worked as a journalist at Der Tagesspiegel, and then she worked at Die Zeit. From 1994 to 1998 she was a writer and reporter there, and from 1998 until 2005 she was an editor in defense and international security.

Beginning in 2005, Stelzenmüller served a four-year term as Director at the Berlin Office of the German Marshall Fund of the United States, and then was a Senior Transatlantic Fellow and director of the Transatlantic Trends survey. In 2007, she succeeded Theo Sommer as the Chair of the Scientific Advisory Board to the German Foundation for Peace Research (de). In 2014, she became the inaugural Robert Bosch Senior Fellow at the Brookings Institution, until 2019. From 2019 to 2020 she was Kissinger Chair on Foreign Policy and International Relations at the Library of Congress.

In addition to the scholarly analysis that she has published as part of her work with research institutions and think tanks, Stelzenmüller has also frequently published articles in the news media on international affairs. She regularly writes analysis in both the English and German media; beginning 2018 she regularly wrote analysis for Financial Times, and she has written many articles for Internationale Politik. She often provides expert opinions on topics relating to German and American politics for outlets including The Washington Post, The New York Times, and Euronews.

== Other activities ==
- Federal Chancellor Helmut Schmidt Foundation, Member of the Board of Trustees (since 2021)
