= Poppenbüttel =

- Quarter of Hamburg
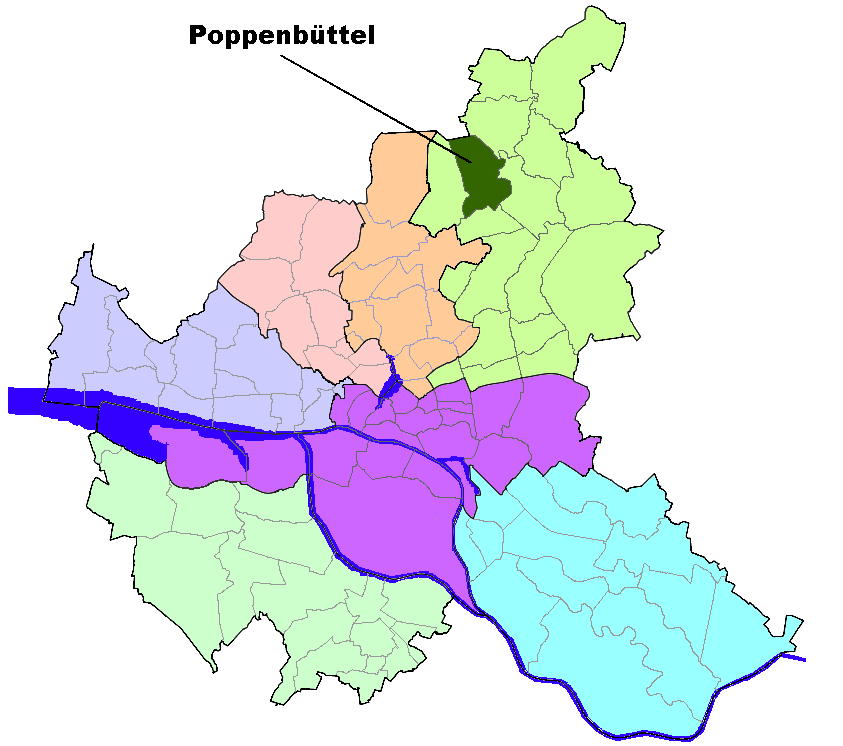
- Location of Poppenbüttel in Hamburg
- Interactive map of Poppenbüttel
- Location within Germany Location within Hamburg
- Coordinates: 53°39′33″N 10°5′5″E
- Country: Germany
- State: Hamburg
- City: Hamburg
- Borough: Wandsbek

Area
  - Total: 8.1 km^{2} (3.1 sq mi)

Population (2024-12-31)
  - Total: 24,598
  - Density: 3,000/km^{2} (7,900/sq mi)
- Time zone: UTC+01:00 (CET)
  - Summer (DST): UTC+02:00 (CEST)
- Dialling codes: 040
- Vehicle registration: HH

Poppenbüttel (German pronunciation: [pɔpn̩ˈbʏtl̩]) is a quarter in the borough Wandsbek of Hamburg, Germany. In 2020 the population was 24,135.

== History ==
Poppenbüttel became a part of Hamburg in 1937. During World War II there were working locations for the subcamp Sasel of Neuengamme concentration camp in the quarter.

== Geography ==
According to the statistical office of Hamburg and Schleswig-Holstein, the quarter has a total area of 8.1 km^{2}. To the northwest, Poppenbüttel borders on the state of Schleswig-Holstein and the quarter Lemsahl-Mellingstedt, in the east is the quarter Sasel. In the south is the quarter Wellingsbüttel and in the southwest is the quarter Hummelsbüttel.

Poppenbüttel lies on both sides of the Upper Alster river and is clearly separated from its neighbouring boroughs by uninhabited green zones and protected landscapes preserving wet and, in places, boggy depressions, and watercourses. In the west the Susebek depression and Raakmoor region separate Poppenbüttel from Langenhorn and Hummelsbüttel; in the northwest the meadows on the Poppenbütteler Graben mark the border with the Schleswig-Holstein borough of Norderstedt, in the north the Mellingbek and Kupferteich delineate its boundary with Lemsahl-Mellingstedt and in the south the Alster valley forms the boundary with Wellingsbüttel. In the east, some of the settlements cross over into Sasel, but in other places they are also separated by the Alster valley .

The Kupferteich, with a length of 900 metres was formed in the 14th century when the Mellingbek was impounded to create a mill pond. It survived even after the mill disappeared. Today, the green zone around it is a local recreation area.

In the middle of Poppenbüttel lies the new development of Hamburg-Bau, built in 1975.

== Demographics ==
21,930 people were living in the quarter in 2006, the population density was 2,701 people per km^{2}. 14.5% were children under the age of 18, and 30.4% were 65 years of age or older, 5.6% were immigrants. 413 people were registered as unemployed. In 1999 there were 10,260 households and 36.7% of all households were made up of individuals.

== Education ==
In 2006 there were 3 elementary schools and 3 secondary schools in the quarter Poppenbüttel.

== Infrastructure ==
=== Health systems ===
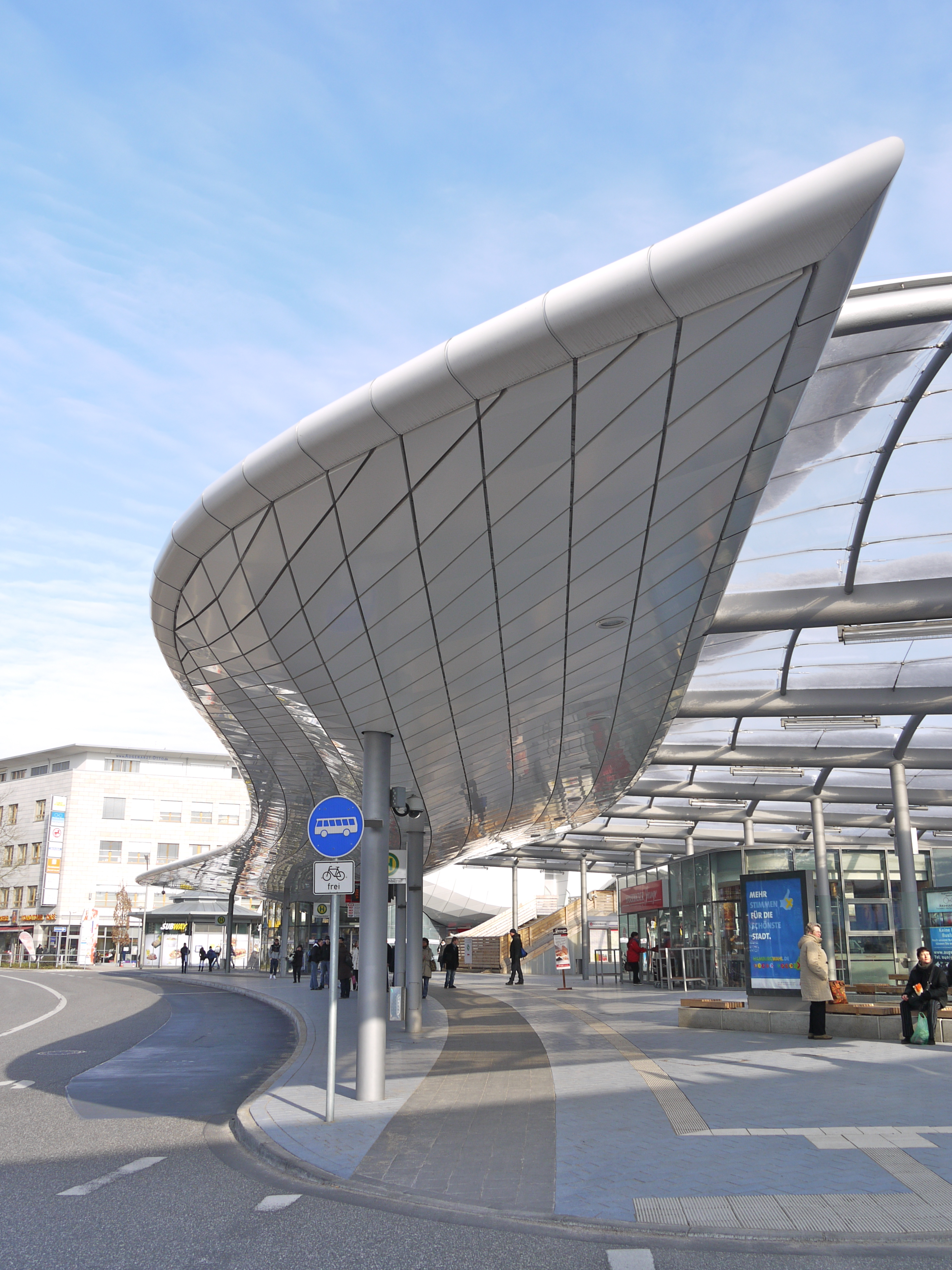

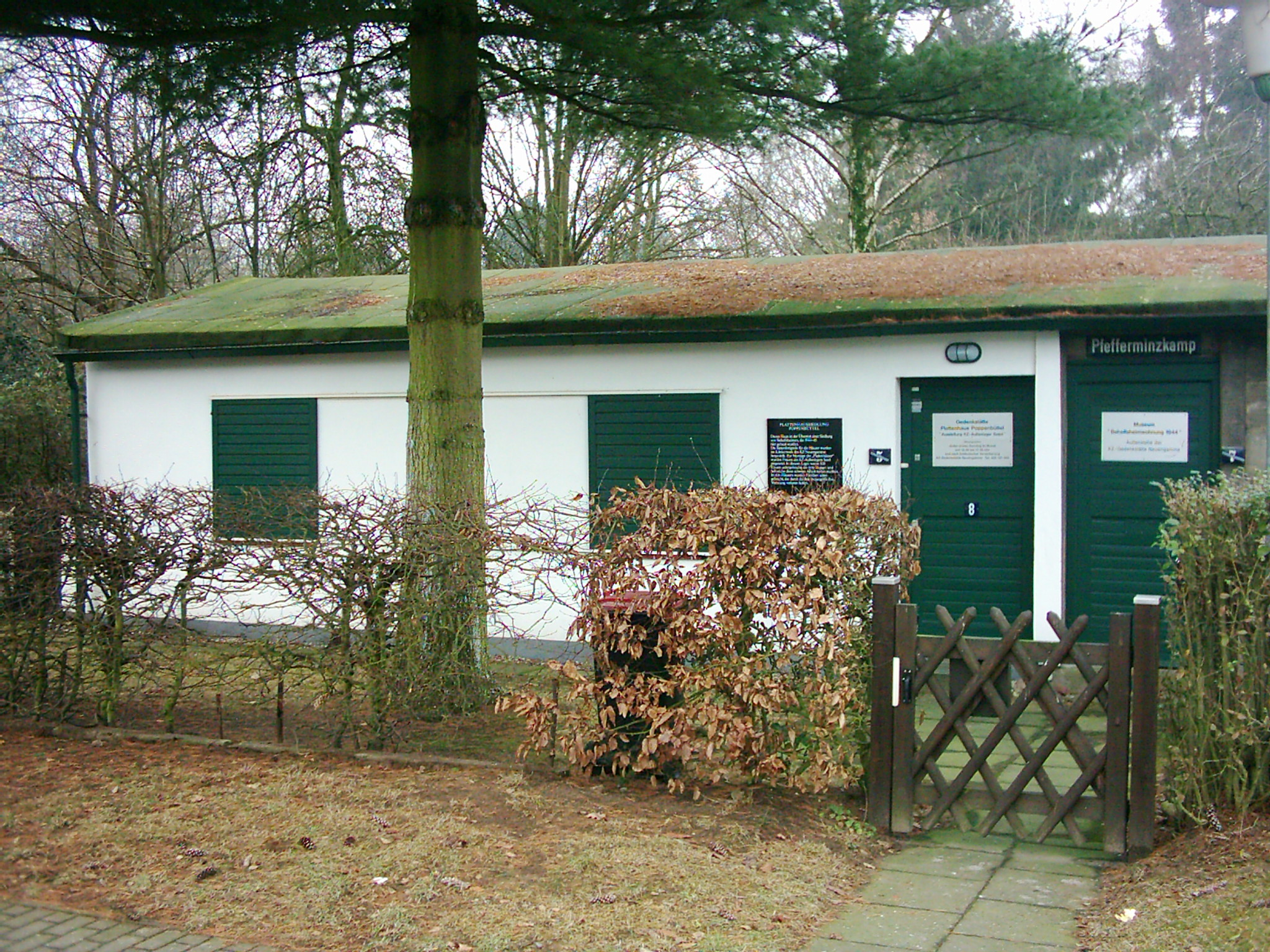
Memorial Hamburg-Poppenbüttel

As of 2006 there were 92 physicians in private practice and 8 pharmacies.

=== Transportation ===
Poppenbüttel is serviced by the rapid transit system of the underground railway and the S-Bahn with several stations. Poppenbüttel railway station is a terminus for the line S1.

According to the Department of Motor Vehicles (Kraftfahrt-Bundesamt), 10,581 private cars are registered in the quarter (484 cars/1000 people).

== Memorial for the concentration subcamp ==
From September 1944 to April 1945, Jewish women from the subcamp Hamburg-Sasel were forced to build houses in this quarter. The last existing house is located in Kritenbarg street, and is now a memorial.
