= Flower of the Year Campaign in Germany =

In 1979, Loki Schmidt (1919–2010), the spouse of former German Federal chancellor Helmut Schmidt, founded the Stiftung zum Schutze gefährdeter Pflanzen ("Foundation for the protection of endangered plants") which became the Stiftung Naturschutz Hamburg und Stiftung zum Schutze gefährdeter Pflanzen ("Foundation Nature Conservancy Hamburg and for the protection of endangered plants") in 1985. One of the main purposes of this organisation is a public awareness campaign about the ecological value of wildflowers. This campaign which celebrate a wildflower of the year was established in 1980. The announcement for the flower of the year is often published in October and events to protect the critically endangered, endangered or vulnerable wildflowers are organised. In 2003, Schmidt published a book about this campaign with watercolour illustrations of the plants by herself and a foreword titled "With Loki's eyes" written by Siegfried Lenz.

== List of wildflowers announced as Flower of the Year in Germany ==
Year	Scientific name	English name	German name	Image
1980	Gentiana pneumonanthe	Marsh gentian	Lungen-Enzian	
1981	Narcissus pseudonarcissus	Wild daffodil	Gelbe Narzisse	
1982	Cephalanthera rubra	Red helleborine	Rotes Waldvögelein	
1983	Tulipa sylvestris	Wild tulip	Wildtulpe	
1984	Adonis aestivalis	Summer pheasant's-eye	Sommer-Adonisröschen	
1985	Aquilegia vulgaris	Common columbine	Wald-Akelei	
1986	Arnica montana	Mountain arnica	Arnika	
1987	Eryngium maritimum	Sea holly	Stranddistel	
1988	Calla palustris	Bog arum	Sumpf-Calla, Drachenwurz	
1989	Dianthus carthusianorum	Carthusian pink	Karthäuser-Nelke	
1990	Jasione montana	Sheep's bit scabious	Sandknöpfchen	
1991	Andromeda polifolia	Bog-rosemary	Rosmarinheide	
1992	Drosera rotundifolia	Common sundew	Rundblättriger Sonnentau	
1993	Fritillaria meleagris	Snake's-head fritillary	Schachbrettblume	
1994	Dactylorhiza majalis	Western marsh orchid	Breitblättriges Knabenkraut	
1995	Trollius europaeus	Globe-flower	Trollblume	
1996	Pulsatilla vulgaris	Pasque-flower	Echte Küchenschelle, Kuhschelle	
1997	Carlina acaulis	Stemless carline thistle	Silberdistel	
1998	Stratiotes aloides	Water soldier	Krebsschere, Wasseraloe	
1999	Caltha palustris	Marsh marigold	Sumpfdotterblume	
2000	Lithospermum purpurocaeruleum	Purple gromwell	Purpurblauer Steinsame	
2001	Geranium sanguineum	Bloody cranesbill	Blutroter Storchschnabel	
2002	Viola riviniana	Common dog-violet	Hain-Veilchen	
2003	Agrostemma githago	Common corncockle	Kornrade	
2004	Soldanella alpina	Alpine snowbell	Alpenglöckchen	
2005	Rhinanthus angustifolius	Greater yellow-rattle	Großer Klappertopf	
2006	Cardamine pratensis	Cuckoo flower	Wiesen-Schaumkraut	
2007	Geum rivale	Water avens	Bach-Nelkenwurz	
2008	Carduus nutans	Nodding thistle	Nickende Distel	
2009	Cichorium intybus	Common chicory	Wegwarte	
2010	Iris sibirica	Siberian iris	Sibirische Schwertlilie	
2011	Narthecium ossifragum	Bog asphodel	Moorlilie	
2012	Dianthus deltoides	Maiden pink	Heidenelke	
2013	Anemone hepatica	Common hepatica	Leberblümchen	
2014	Butomus umbellatus	Flowering rush	Schwanenblume	
2015	Succisa pratensis	Devil's-bit	Gewöhnlicher Teufelsabbiss	
2016	Primula veris	Cowslip	Echte Schlüsselblume	
2017	Papaver rhoeas	Common poppy	Klatschmohn	
2018	Veronica longifolia	Garden speedwell	Langblättriger Ehrenpreis	
2019	Calluna vulgaris	Common Heather	Besenheide	
2020	Menyanthes trifoliata	Bogbean	Fieberklee	
2021	Sanguisorba officinalis	Great burnet	Großer Wiesenknopf	
