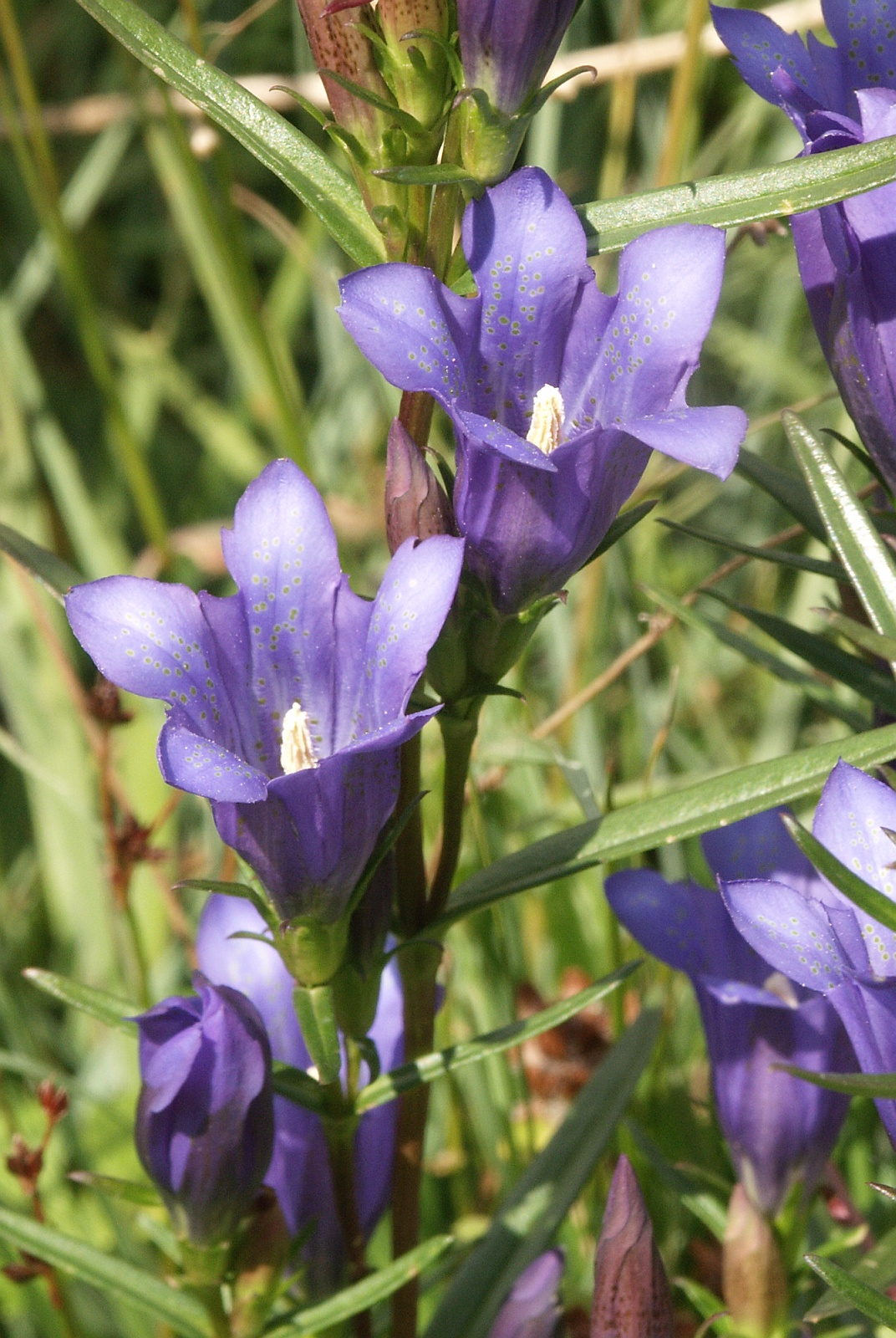

Scientific classification
- Kingdom: Plantae
- Clade: Tracheophytes
- Clade: Angiosperms
- Clade: Eudicots
- Clade: Asterids
- Order: Gentianales
- Family: Gentianaceae
- Genus: Gentiana
- Species: G. pneumonanthe

Binomial name
- Gentiana pneumonanthe L.

= Gentiana pneumonanthe =

Species of plant

Gentiana pneumonanthe, the marsh gentian, is a species of the genus Gentiana. It was the first wildflower announced as flower of the year in Germany in 1980. The species can be found in marshes and moorlands. Due to land use change and the disappearance and fragmentation of these habitats, the species is currently the focus of conservation projects throughout Europe. It is the host-plant of the Alcon blue (Phengaris alcon), and the only plant species on which this butterfly lays its eggs.
