= Helmut Schmidt =

Chancellor of Germany from 1974 to 1982

- Schmidt in 1977

Chancellor of Germany (Note: Due to the division of Germany, Helmut Schmidt was only the Federal Chancellor in West Germany. The term West Germany is only the common English name for the Federal Republic of Germany between its formation on 23 May 1949 and the German reunification through the accession of East Germany on 3 October 1990. The office of the chancellor no longer existed in East Germany.)
- In office 16 May 1974 – 1 October 1982
- President: Gustav Heinemann; Walter Scheel; Karl Carstens
- Vice-Chancellor: Hans-Dietrich Genscher; Egon Franke
- Preceded by: Willy Brandt
- Succeeded by: Helmut Kohl

Finance Minister
- In office 7 July 1972 – 16 May 1974
- Chancellor: Willy Brandt
- Preceded by: Karl Schiller
- Succeeded by: Hans Apel

Minister for Economics
- In office 7 July 1972 – 15 December 1972
- Chancellor: Willy Brandt
- Preceded by: Karl Schiller
- Succeeded by: Hans Friderichs

Defence Minister
- In office 22 October 1969 – 7 July 1972
- Chancellor: Willy Brandt
- Preceded by: Gerhard Schröder
- Succeeded by: Georg Leber

Leader of the Social Democratic Party in the Bundestag
- In office 14 March 1967 – 22 October 1969
- Deputy: See list: Alex Möller; Karl Schiller; Egon Franke; Martin Hirsch; Ernst Schellenberg; Hans-Jürgen Junghans; Hans Apel; Friedrich Schäfer
- Preceded by: Fritz Erler
- Succeeded by: Herbert Wehner

Hamburg Senator for the Interior
- In office 13 December 1961 – 14 December 1965
- First Mayor: Paul Nevermann; Herbert Weichmann
- Preceded by: Wilhelm Kröger
- Succeeded by: Heinz Ruhau
Parliamentary constituencies
Member of the Bundestag for Hamburg
In office 20 October 1969 – 18 February 1987
Preceded by	Nikolaus Jürgensen
Succeeded by	Rolf Niese
Constituency	Hamburg-Bergedorf
In office 19 October 1965 – 20 October 1969
Electoral list	Social Democratic Party
Preceded by	Multi-member district
Succeeded by	Multi-member district
In office 15 October 1957 – 19 January 1962
Preceded by	Willy Max Rademacher
Succeeded by	Eugen Glombig
Constituency	Hamburg VIII
In office 6 October 1953 – 15 October 1957
Electoral list	Social Democratic Party
Preceded by	Multi-member district
Succeeded by	Multi-member district
Member of the European Parliament for West Germany
In office 27 February 1958 – 29 November 1961
Preceded by	Multi-member district
Succeeded by	Multi-member district

Personal details
- Born: Helmut Heinrich Waldemar Schmidt; 23 December 1918 Barmbeck, Hamburg, Weimar Republic
- Died: 10 November 2015 (aged 96) Hamburg, Germany
- Resting place: Ohlsdorf Cemetery
- Party: SPD (from 1946)
- Spouse: Hannelore "Loki" Glaser (m. 1942; died 2010)
- Domestic partner: Ruth Loah (from 2012)
- Children: 2
- Education: University of Hamburg
- Occupation: Politician; civil servant; publisher; economist

Military service
- Allegiance: Nazi Germany
- Branch/service: Luftwaffe
- Years of service: 1937–1945
- Rank: Oberleutnant (d.R.)
- Unit: 1st Panzer Division
- Battles/wars: Second World War; Eastern Front; Operation Barbarossa; Siege of Leningrad; Battle of Moscow; Western Front; Battle of the Bulge
- Awards: Iron Cross 2nd Class

Helmut Heinrich Waldemar Schmidt (German: [ˈhɛlmuːt ˈʃmɪt]; 23 December 1918 – 10 November 2015) was a German politician and member of the Social Democratic Party of Germany (SPD), who served as Chancellor of West Germany from 1974 to 1982. He was the longest lived chancellor in German history and had the longest post-chancellorship, at over 33 years. He was also the only chancellor to serve in the Wehrmacht during World War II.

Before becoming chancellor, Helmut Schmidt served as defence minister (1969–1972) and finance minister (1972–1974) in the government of Willy Brandt. In this capacity, his financial policies were met with substantial approval. As chancellor, Schmidt focused on international affairs, seeking "political unification of Europe in partnership with the United States". During his leadership, he also prioritized European co-operation and international economic co-ordination. Despite being re-elected chancellor in 1976 and 1980, his coalition fell apart in 1982 with the switch by his coalition allies, the Free Democratic Party.

In 1986, Schmidt retired from Parliament after clashing with the left wing of the SPD, which opposed him on defence and economic issues. He later became a leading proponent of the European monetary union and a European Central Bank.

== Background, family, early life and education ==
Helmut Schmidt was the elder of two sons to Ludovica Koch (10 November 1890 – 29 November 1968) and Gustav Ludwig Schmidt (18 April 1888 – 26 March 1981) in Barmbek, a working-class district of Hamburg, in 1918. Schmidt studied at Hamburg Lichtwark School, graduating in 1937. Schmidt's father was born the biological son of a German Jewish banker; Ludwig Gumpel, and a Christian waitress, Friederike Wenzel, and then covertly adopted, although this was kept a family secret for many years. This was confirmed publicly by Schmidt in 1984, after Valéry Giscard d'Estaing revealed the fact to journalists, apparently with Schmidt's assent. Helmut Schmidt was a non-practising Protestant.

Schmidt was a group leader (Scharführer) in the Hitler Youth organisation until 1936, when he was demoted and sent on leave because of his anti-Nazi views. However, documents from 1942 praise his "Impeccable national socialist [Nazi] behaviour", and in 1944 his superiors mentioned that Schmidt "stands the ground of national socialist ideology, knowing that he must pass it on." On 27 June 1942, he married his childhood sweetheart Hannelore "Loki" Glaser (3 March 1919 – 21 October 2010). They had two children: Helmut Walter (26 June 1944 – 19 February 1945, died of meningitis), and Susanne (born 8 May 1947), who works in London for Bloomberg Television. Schmidt resumed his education in Hamburg after the war, graduating in economics and political science in 1949.

== Military service ==
Schmidt had planned to study without interruption. Therefore, he volunteered at age 18 for military service in 1937. He began serving with an anti-aircraft battery of Luftwaffe at Vegesack near Bremen.

In World War II, after brief service on the Eastern Front during the invasion of the Soviet Union in 1941 (including the Siege of Leningrad), he returned to Germany in 1942 to work as a trainer and adviser at the Ministry of Aviation. During his service in World War II, Schmidt was awarded the Iron Cross 2nd Class.

He attended the People's Court as a military spectator at some of the show trials for officers involved in the 20 July plot, in which an unsuccessful attempt was made to assassinate Hitler at Rastenburg, and was disgusted by Judge Roland Freisler's conduct.

Toward the end of the war, from December 1944 onwards, he served as an Oberleutnant in the Flak artillery on the Western Front during the Battle of the Bulge and the Ardennes Offensive. He was captured by the British in April 1945 on Lüneburg Heath, and was a prisoner of war until August of that year in Belgium. In 1958 Schmidt was promoted to Hauptmann of the Bundeswehr reserve.

== Post-World War II ==
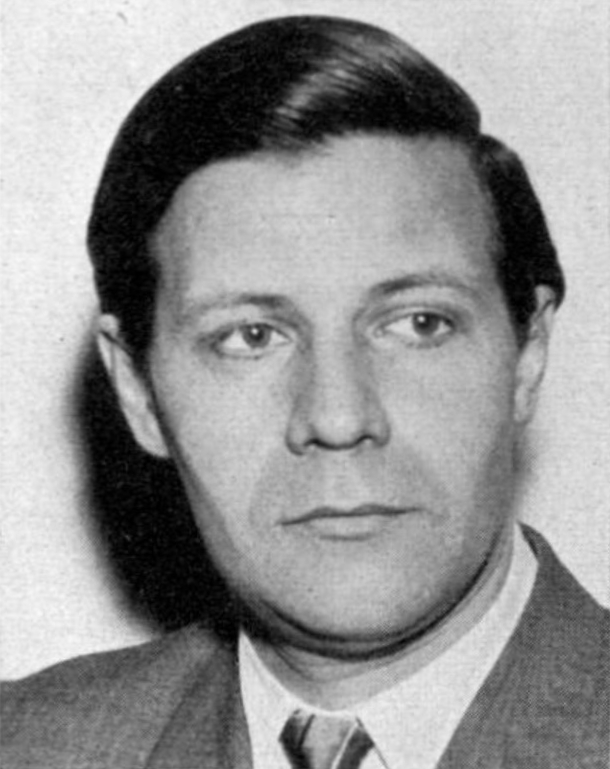
Schmidt's official Bundestag portrait, 1953

Schmidt joined the Social Democratic Party of Germany (SPD) in 1946, and from 1947 to 1948 was the leader of the Socialist German Student League, the student organisation of the SPD. Upon graduating from the University of Hamburg, where he read economics, he worked for the government of the city-state of Hamburg, working in the department of Economic Policy. Beginning in 1952, under Karl Schiller, he was a senior figure heading up the Behörde für Wirtschaft und Verkehr (the Hamburg State Ministry for Economy and Transport).

He was elected to the Bundestag in 1953, and in 1957 he became a member of the SPD parliamentary party executive. A vocal critic of conservative government policy, his outspoken rhetoric in parliament earned him the nickname Schmidt-Schnauze ("Schmidt the Lip"). (Note: The German word Schnauze designates the mouth and nose area of an animal like a dog or a wolf; so the epithet indicates a ready wit and a sharp tongue, suitable for (metaphorically) tearing his opponents' arguments to pieces. In the early years of the Bundestag, it was commonplace to announce a speaker's name followed by his or her electoral district, so Schmidt-Schnauze is also interpreted as a play on words.) In 1958, he joined the national board of the SPD (Bundesvorstand), and campaigned against nuclear weapons and the equipping of the Bundeswehr with such devices. He alarmed some in his party by taking part in manoeuvres as a reserve officer in the newly formed Bundeswehr. In 1962, he gave up his seat in parliament to concentrate on his tasks in Hamburg.

== Senator ==
The government of the city-state of Hamburg is known as the Senate of Hamburg, and from 1961 to 1965, Schmidt was the Innensenator: the senator of the interior. He gained a reputation as a Macher (Note: Literally, a maker or doer; in the sense of "a man of action") – someone who gets things done regardless of obstacles – by his effective management during the emergency caused by the 1962 flood, during which 300 people drowned. Schmidt used all means at his disposal to alleviate the situation, even when that meant overstepping his legal authority, including employing the federal police and army units (ignoring the German constitution's prohibition on using the army for "internal affairs"; a clause excluding disasters was not added until 1968). Describing his actions, Schmidt said, "I wasn't put in charge of these units – I took charge of them!" He saved a further 1,000 lives and swiftly managed the re-housing of thousands of the homeless.

== Return to federal politics ==
In 1965, he was re-elected to the Bundestag. In 1967, after the formation of the Grand Coalition between the SPD and the Christian Democratic Union (CDU), he became chairman of the Social Democratic parliamentary party, a post he held until the elections of 1969. In 1968, he was elected deputy party chairman, a post that he held until 1983. Unlike Willy Brandt and Gerhard Schröder, he never became chairman of the party.

In October 1969, he entered the government of Willy Brandt as defence minister. During his term in office, the military conscription time was reduced from 18 to 15 months, while at the same time increasing the number of young men being conscripted. Additionally, Schmidt decided to introduce the Bundeswehr universities Helmut Schmidt University in Hamburg and the University of the Bundeswehr Munich in Neubiberg (Munich district) to broaden the academic education of the German officer corps, and the situation of non-commissioned officers was improved. In July 1972, he succeeded Karl Schiller as Minister for Economics and Finance, but in November 1972, he relinquished the Economics department, which was again made a separate ministry. Schmidt remained Minister of Finance and faced the prospect of rising inflation. Shortly before the Oil Shock of 1973, which rattled Britain and the United States, Schmidt agreed that European currencies should be floated against the US dollar. He remained in charge of finance until May 1974.

== Chancellor of West Germany (1974–1982) ==
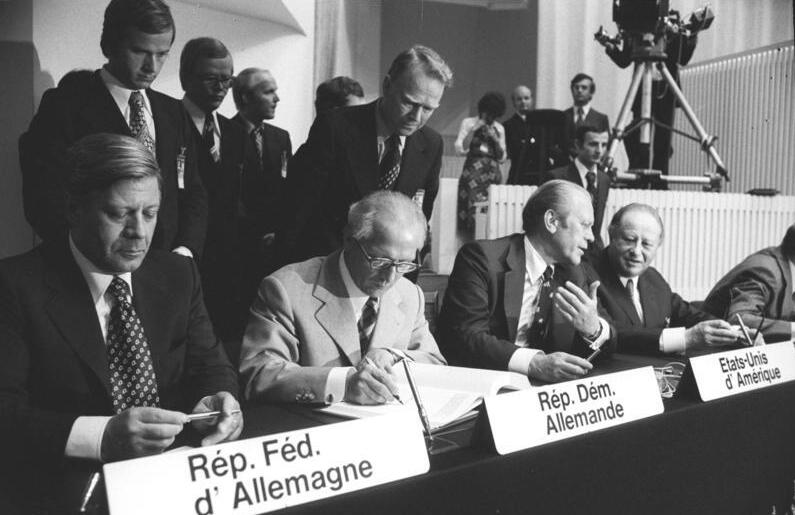
Schmidt, Erich Honecker, Gerald Ford and Bruno Kreisky in 1975 in Helsinki

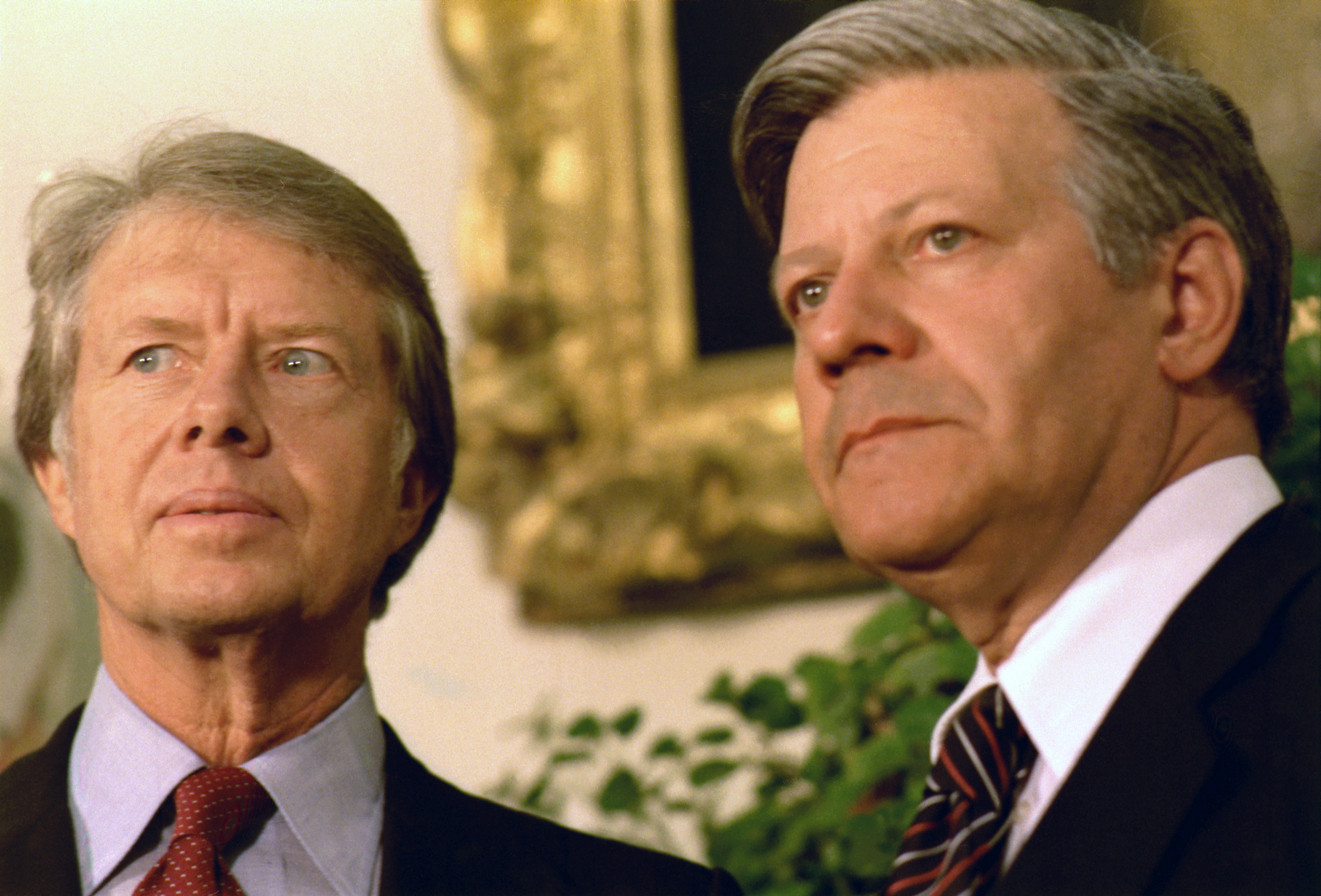
U.S. president Jimmy Carter and Schmidt in July 1977

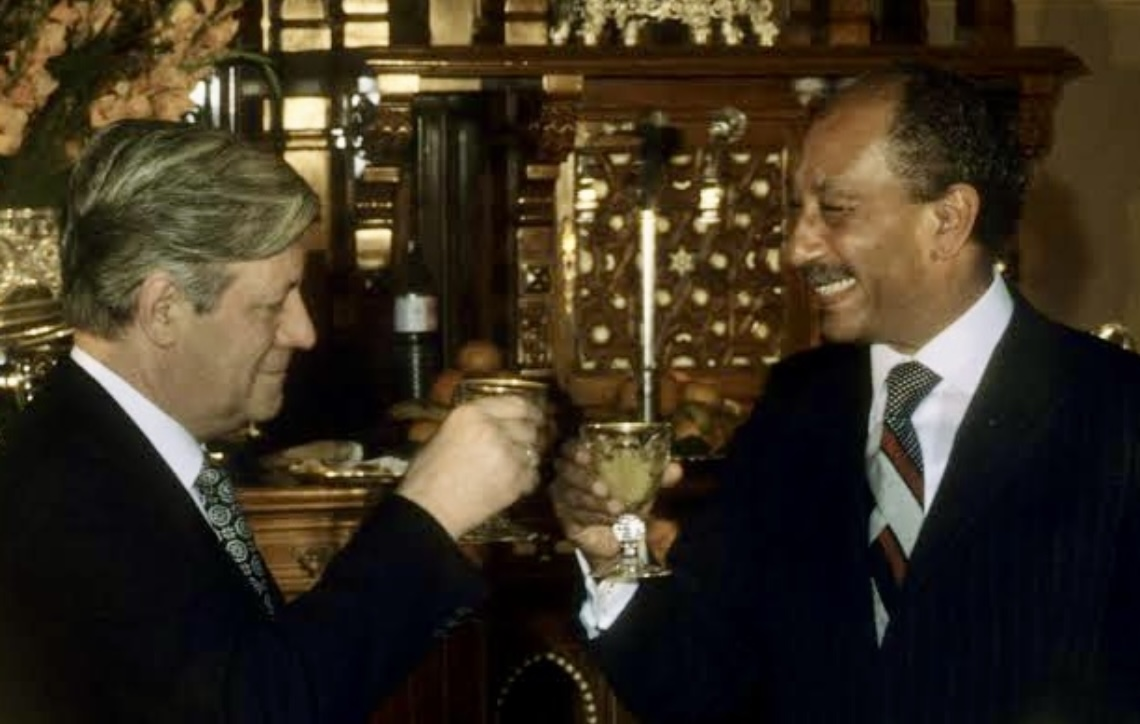
Egyptian President Anwar Sadat and Schmidt in July 1977

Schmidt became Chancellor of West Germany on 16 May 1974, after Brandt's resignation in the wake of an espionage scandal. The worldwide economic recession was the main problem his administration faced, and Schmidt took a tough and disciplined line in the reduction of public spending. Schmidt was also active in improving relations with France. Together with the French President Valéry Giscard d'Estaing, he was one of the fathers of the world economic summits, the first of which assembled in 1975. In 1975, he was a signatory of the Helsinki Accords to create the Conference for Security and Co-operation in Europe, the precursor of today's OSCE. In 1978, he helped set up the European Monetary System (EMS).

He remained as Chancellor after the 1976 federal election, in coalition with the liberal Free Democratic Party (FDP). He adopted a tough, uncompromising line with the indigenous Red Army Faction (RAF) extremists. In October 1977, he ordered an anti-terrorist unit of Bundesgrenzschutz policemen to end the Palestinian terrorist hijacking of a Lufthansa aircraft named Landshut, staged to secure the release of imprisoned RAF leaders, after it landed in Mogadishu, Somalia. Three of the four kidnappers were killed during the assault on the plane, but all 86 passengers and the remaining 4 crew were rescued unharmed, the captain having been killed by the kidnappers earlier.

Schmidt was re-elected as Chancellor in November 1980. Concerned about the Soviet invasion of Afghanistan, and the Soviet superiority regarding missiles in Central Europe, Schmidt issued proposals resulting in the NATO Double-Track Decision, concerning the deployment of medium-range nuclear missiles in Western Europe, should the Soviets not disarm. This decision was unpopular with the German public. A mass demonstration against the deployment mobilised 400,000 people in October 1981.

At the beginning of his period as chancellor, Schmidt was a proponent of Keynesian economics, and pursued expansionary monetary and fiscal policies during his tenure. Between 1979 and 1982, the Schmidt administration pursued such policies in an effort to reduce unemployment. These were moderately successful, as the fiscal measures introduced after 1977, with reductions in income and wealth taxes and an increase in the medium-term public investment programme, were estimated to have created 160,000 additional jobs in 1978–1979 or 300,000 if additional public sector employment was included in the figure. The small reduction in the unemployment rate, however, was achieved at the cost of a larger budget deficit (which rose from 31.2 billion DM to 75.7 billion DM in 1981), brought about by fiscal expansion.

During the 1970s, West Germany was able to weather the global financial storm far better than almost all the other developed countries, with unemployment and inflation kept at comparatively low levels. During the 1976 election campaign, the SPD/FDP coalition was able to win the battle of statistics, whether the figures related to employees' incomes, strikes, unemployment, growth, or public sector debts. Amongst other social improvements, old age pensions had been doubled between 1969 and 1976, and unemployment benefits increased to 68% of previous earnings.

Whilst visiting Saudi Arabia in April 1981, Schmidt made some unguarded remarks about the Israeli–Palestinian conflict that succeeded in aggravating the delicate relations between Israel and West Germany. Asked by a reporter about the moral aspect of German-Israeli relations, he stated that Israel was not in a position to criticise Germany due to its handling of Palestinians, and "That won't do. And in particular, it won't do for a German living in a divided nation and laying moral claim to the right of self-determination for the German people. One must then recognise the moral claim of the Palestinian people to the right of self-determination." On 3 May, Israeli Prime Minister Menachem Begin denounced Schmidt as "unprincipled, avaricious, heartless, and lacking in human feeling", and stated that he had "willingly served in the German armies that murdered millions." Begin was also upset over remarks that Schmidt had made on West German television the previous week, in which he spoke apologetically about the suffering Germany inflicted on various nations during World War II; but made no mention of the Jews. On his flight home from Riyadh, Schmidt told his advisers that war guilt could not continue to affect Germany's foreign relations.

Schmidt was the first world leader to call upon newly elected French president François Mitterrand, who visited Bonn in July 1981. The two found themselves in "complete agreement" on foreign policy matters and relations with the United States and the Soviet Union, but differed on trade and economic issues.

By the end of his term, however, Schmidt had turned away from deficit spending, due to a deteriorating economic situation, and a number of welfare cuts were carried out, including smaller increases in child benefits and higher unemployment and health contributions. Large sections of the SPD increasingly opposed his security policy, while most of the FDP politicians strongly supported that policy. While representatives of the left wing of the Social Democratic Party opposed a reduction in state expenditures, the FDP began proposing a monetarist economic policy. In February 1982, Schmidt won a motion of confidence; however, on 17 September 1982, the coalition broke apart, with the four FDP ministers leaving his cabinet. Schmidt continued to lead a minority government composed only of SPD members, while the FDP negotiated a coalition with the CDU/CSU. During this time, Schmidt also headed the Ministry of Foreign Affairs. On 1 October 1982, the FDP supported a CDU-proposed constructive vote of no confidence, ousting Schmidt in favour of CDU chairman Helmut Kohl as the new chancellor. This was the only time in the history of the Federal Republic that a chancellor was removed from office in this way.

=== Domestic reforms ===
Although Schmidt did not feel that he was in a position to substantially extend the social reforms of the Brandt Administration, due to the economic problems he encountered during his time as chancellor, a wide range of reforms were nevertheless carried out under his administration. Increases were made to pensions, which went up in numerical terms. Adjusted for changes in the annual price index, pensions went up in real terms. However, the rate of pension was not changed in 1978 (even though prices increased by 2.7%), and in 1980 and 1981 the real value of pensions fell by 1.5% and 2.3%, respectively. Improvements were made in family allowances, with monthly subsidies for children increased by over 100% in 1975.

Economic Statistics
Year	Pension	Inflation	Index	Real Value
1975	11.1%		+5.1%	
1976	11.0%		+6.7%	
1977	9.9%		+6.2%	
1978		+2.7%	0	
1979	4.5%		+0.4%	
1980	4%			−1.5%
1981	4%			−2.3%
1982	5.8%		+0.6%	

Improvements were made to invalidity and old-age pension provision for the unemployed, who (from 1977 onwards) were technically insured free of charge under the old-age pension and invalidity scheme. Previously, there had only existed partial and restricted coverage for the unemployed. The Law to Improve Occupational Old Age Pensions (1974) extended coverage of occupational pensions, whilst also "co-ordinating them more closely with state pensions and setting minimum standards as regards benefit levels and the preservation of pension rights". By 1976, as a result of this legislation, 65% of private sector employees were covered by occupational schemes, and over two-thirds of these workers were eligible for benefits equal to more than 15% of their earnings at retirement. This legislation also stipulated that entitlements to occupational pensions must not expire after leaving a firm, and that occupational pensions must not be reduced as a result of receipt of benefits under the public insurance system. The Social Insurance Law for the Handicapped (1975) extended compulsory coverage to disabled persons working in special establishments for the disabled (medical benefits and cash benefits to replace earnings from work). In 1976, a new declaration of social rights was made, and in 1979, an Act was passed which lowered the pensionable age for severely disabled persons to 61 years, and to 60 years as from 1980.

In October 1974, the Rehabilitation Benefits Alignment Act was passed, with the intention of promoting the rehabilitation of the disabled by extending certain benefits to them. To meet the need for more uniform medical treatment in rural areas and on the peripheral of cities due to a lack of panel doctors in those areas, a bill was passed in December 1976 which improved the possibilities of panel doctors' associations by ensuring that panel doctors were available to provide treatment, while also providing for planning according to need and the participation of the sickness insurances. An Act of August 1975 on criminal law reform introduced "other forms of assistance" such as medical advice on contraception, together with assistance pertaining to sterilisation and abortion. New assistance benefits were created in 1975 for family planning and maternity consultations, whilst a constant attendance allowance was increased. Housing renovation and energy savings legislation was introduced in 1977, while a constitutional reform of 1981 increased federal powers in health and education.

In July 1974, special benefits were introduced to compensate for wages not paid as a result of bankruptcy for a maximum of up to three months. Increases in income limits for housing allowances were carried out, together with housing allowance rates, while major improvements were made in welfare provision for the elderly. By 1982, the purchasing power of the average pension was 2.5% better than in 1975. In 1975, tax allowances were replaced by child benefits, while payment for the first child was introduced. A tax relief act reduced income taxes and provided additional tax benefits for housing allowances. The Schmidt administration also introduced social policy legislation in the late 1970s, which increased family allowances (though by a smaller amount than in 1974) and maternity leave benefits. The increases in benefits under the Schmidt administration arguably had a positive impact on reducing inequalities, with the percentage of West Germans living in poverty (according to one measurement) falling between 1978 and 1982.

Under the law of June 1974, the residents could participate in the management of the establishment through a consultative committee. A law of June 1975 amended the Employment Protection Law and the Law on the provision of temporary workers, which improved the legal protection of temporary migrant workers in West Germany. A law of December 1975 gave the right to claim under the sickness insurance scheme for medical consultations for family planning purposes. A law of May 1975 extended social security to disabled persons according to various procedures.

A law of April 1976 on youth employment limited working hours to 40 hours in a 5-day week, raised the minimum working age from 14 to 15, increased leave, improved conditions for release from work for day attendance at vocational training school and for periods of weeks under the block release system, and improved protection at work by restrictions on employment in dangerous or unhealthy work. A law on protection against dismissal was amended by abolishing the minimum age limit of 18, so that young workers under eighteen were now also protected against dismissal. The Ministry for Youth, Family Affairs and Health encouraged a pilot scheme, of a scientific nature, aimed at promoting the development of qualified advisory services on family planning, sexual problems and problems linked with pregnancy. A regulation of June 1976 laid down detailed rules governing "aid to overcome particular social difficulties". This measure was specially aimed at marginal social groups, such as former convicts and the homeless, and consisted of providing information, personal guidance, help in obtaining and maintaining a home and in obtaining and keeping a job, in addition to guidance as regards training and the organisation of leisure time. The general section of the Social Code, which came into effect in January 1976, introduced basic measures concerning the social services. It laid down an obligation to establish the services and institutions needed by the population and to provide them with information and advice on their social rights. These provisions had already had certain effects, in particular a considerable growth in home help services and social centres. A regulation in application of a 1974 law on old people's homes and adult hostels was introduced, according to which compulsory consultative committees could be set up by the residents to ensure their participation in the running of these establishments in a greater measure than in the past. A law passed in August 1974 supplemented the protection provided for handicapped people under a law passed during the Brandt Administration in April 1974 by providing that, henceforth, the benefits for the purposes of medical and occupational rehabilitation would be the same for all the categories of persons concerned: war victims, the sick, the victims of industrial accidents, congenitally handicapped persons: a total of about 4 million persons in all.

The 1976 Act for the Promotion of Urban Development and the 1977 Housing Modernisation Act, together with the 1971 Act for the Promotion of Urban Development passed by the Brandt Administration, enabled most West German cities by the end of the Seventies to introduce programmes aimed at renovating their pre-war residential areas. Additional tax reforms were introduced that lowered the tax burden on low-income households, and which played an important role "in pre-empting a real decline in the income and purchasing power of workers". A law was passed to encourage low-income home ownership, while 250 million marks was provided in 1978 for the promotion of sports and physical education. That same year, entitlement to educational allowances was extended to all tenth-grade pupils in vocational education.

The Introductory Tax Reform Law (1974) increased bad weather payments, part-time workers' benefits and insurance benefits to 68% of net wages, fixed special benefits during vocational training at 90% of net earnings, increased assistance benefits to 58% of net earnings, and abolished special family benefits "in favour of the inclusion of the unemployed under general child allowance scheme". A special tax credit was introduced in 1978 in cases of particular financial burden due to children, while a substantial increase in the child allowance was made in 1979. Several policy changes were carried out between 1976 and 1982, such as tax credits and family allowances, which compensated unions for wage restraint and "guaranteed the maintenance of a constant income level for employed persons and their families". Increases were made in child benefits, which rose on a regular basis (particularly for families with more than one child) for most of the years that the Schmidt Administration was in office.

Various measures were also carried out to mitigate the effects of unemployment. Employment creation schemes were introduced to help young workers. The Training Opportunities Act (1976) helped (over a four-year period) to increase the number of vocational training places from 450,000 to 630,000 a year. In 1976, a provisional law was introduced to boost the number of apprentices, which reduced the number of young people out of work. An experimental retraining programme was launched on the shop floor (lasting from 1979 to 1981), which benefited 45,680 people.

In June 1974, a reformed food law was passed into law, which aimed to safeguard consumers from physical harm. The Students' Sickness Insurance Law (1975) extended compulsory coverage to students (medical benefits only), while the Artists' Social Insurance Law (1981) introduced compulsory insurance for artists below a certain income-limit. The Detergents Law (1975) and the Effluency Levies Act (1978) were passed to encourage environmental protection. In 1975, the allowable duration of unemployment benefit payment was extended to twenty-four months during periods of general recession. The 1976 law on standard terms of sale gave consumer groups the right to file suits against companies employing unfair terms of sale. The Higher Education Framework Act of 1976 pronounced that scientific continuing education was a task to be implemented by the institutions of the system of higher education, thus exceeding their traditional tasks of research and lecturing. In 1977, an "investment programme for the future" was decided upon by the Schmidt Administration, which provided DM 16 thousand million for the improvement of the transport system, an efficient and ecological energy supply, provisions for water supply, vocational training, and the safeguarding of the environment.

Under a regulation of December 1976, four new occupational diseases were recognised. To expand training opportunities for girls, a pilot scheme was launched in 1978 to open up certain skilled industrial and technical occupations to them. Laws restricting the access of migrant workers to certain regions were repealed in 1977, and the existing provisions were made more flexible in order to allow the children of migrant workers who had entered the Federal Republic of Germany in 1975/1976 access to employment. Legislation governing old people's homes and adult assistance establishments was further supplemented by two regulations, one imposing minimum requirements concerning premises, and the other laying down rules for financial management to ensure that residents were not financially exploited.

The Fifth Amendment of July 1979 to the Employment Promotion Law provided among other things for an improvement in conditions governing financial support towards basic vocational training for unemployed young people with at least one year's vocational experience, the expansion of training activities for jobs in which there is a shortage of skilled workers and easier access to further vocational training facilities for problem groups (such as the unskilled, the unemployed, and women generally). In 1979, the Federal Minister for Education and Science made funds available for a new further education establishment to train instructors. Under a law amending the law respecting technical working media and the Industrial Code of August 1979, machines and equipment which had been voluntarily submitted for testing and passed by an established body may bear the marking "GS" (=safety-tested). For medical equipment, the Federal Minister of Labour and Social Affairs was authorised to issue orders containing further safety provisions, while the resale of hazardous equipment and its display at exhibitions may be prohibited in future by factory inspectors even in the case of trading companies.

In 1979, DM 219 million was set aside for about 80,000 dwellings under the modernisation programme for dwellings worthy of preservation run jointly by the Federal authorities and the individual Länder (50% of this money was earmarked for modernisation priority areas). In addition, DM 2,350 million was made available under a five-year programme to improve the housing stock. Loans and higher tax rebates were also used to encourage modernisation of dwellings and energy-saving measures. 577 slum clearance and urban development schemes in 459 municipalities were also accorded financial support amounting to DM 183.5 million under a law on the promotion of urban development. A law of October 1979 granted a lump-sum allowance for the winter of 1979/80 to help low-income groups to meet the additional outlay incurred by the rise in fuel costs. In August 1979, a programme was adopted for foreign refugees, with resources allocated for aid concerning information, legal advice, psycho-social and medical assistance and for measures to facilitate the integration of refugees or their emigration to other countries.

Under a law of July 1980, a farmer's surviving spouse wishing to continue working on the farm could obtain a helper or temporary aid from the agricultural pension fund. Any spouse choosing not to do so was entitled to a survivor's allowance if he or she was no longer able to find suitable paid employment, either for reasons of age (over 45) or because there were children to bring up. In other cases, the allowance was designed to facilitate reintegration into working life. This allowance guaranteed the spouse protection under the agricultural sickness insurance scheme, which also covered self-employed fishermen and beekeepers.

A special programme was introduced, specially designed for young people who, because of their poor level of education and language ability, were unable to find a suitable job or training place. The young people were offered a one-year full-time course of training to qualify them for a training place or job, and in September 1980, approximately 15,000 young people were participating in these courses. From 1980 onwards, parents could deduct the cost of day care for their children (in day nurseries and nursery schools in particular) from their taxable income up to an annual maximum of DM 600 or DM 1,200 depending on whether the income of a single parent or that of a married couple was involved. Major additions were also made to the regulations on dangerous substances, while comprehensive new regulations concerning installations requiring supervision were introduced. The Federal Ministry for Youth, Family Affairs and Health gave particular attention to assisting parents in assuming their educational responsibilities towards their children. For instance, special "letters to parents" were distributed free of charge to parents of children under 8, with some 3 million sent in 1979. A determined effort was also made to provide better education for socially disadvantaged children by supporting pilot schemes and research projects. Public funds had been allocated from 1979 onwards to a pilot scheme entitled "Aid to children in need" under which children's communities were set up in Berlin and Gütersloh to protect and care for children who had been or were at risk of being ill-treated by their parents, while at the same time the family education and advisory services were assigned the task of educating these parents.

In terms of workplace rights, a "parity" system was introduced (although in a weakened form) on the supervisory boards of all companies employing over 2,000 workers, a reform which West German trade unions had long fought for. This law improved employee representation on the supervisory boards of companies outside the steel and coal industries. The main provision of this new piece of legislation was that in the 650 major companies that accounted for 70% of West Germany's output, employee representation on the supervisory boards rose from one-third to one-half. In 1976, the Young Persons (Protection of Employment) Act was passed, which forbade the employment of children and young persons required to attend full-time education, with minor exceptions.

The social protection of civil servants and judges (Bund and Länder) was standardised and improved by a law of August 1974. Under a law of May 1976, victims of acts of violence and their survivors would in future have the right to compensation in respect of the physical and economic consequences in the same manner as protection for war victims. In 1977, DM 8 million was made available by the federal government to welfare bodies to build and modernise holiday homes for families. That same year, the conditions for investment in the privately financed construction of rented dwellings were improved by the reintroduction of decreasing depreciation for buildings. In order to take the situation of the unemployed into account to the maximum possible extent in asset formation policy, certain legal provisions were amended so that, in the event of unemployment, personal payments could be made to continue savings plans which entailed employers' contributions. In addition, workers who had been unemployed for a year or more could unblock savings plans before the end of the freeze without losing the financial benefits offered by the State. A new special programme with funds of DM 100 million was launched at the start of 1978 to improve training and job opportunities for the disabled. The budget of the Federal Labour Office was increased exceptionally by more than 20%, whilst special emphasis was placed on measures to promote vocational training, job creation, advanced training and retraining. The aim was to reduce the high proportion of unemployed persons lacking training and increase the chances of this group to obtain employment.

A wide range of social liberal reforms were also carried out during Schmidt's time in office. A marriage and divorce law of 1976 instituted the principle of maintenance obligations of each economically stronger partner, That same year, a reform of naming for partners after marriage was carried out, together with a reform of marriage law, which eliminated "moral guilt" as a criterion for alimony payment obligations. The First Marriage Reform Law of 1976 stated that pension entitlements acquired during marriage must be shared with the economically weaker spouse following divorce. In 1977, a law was introduced which enabled married women to enter employment without the permission of their husbands, while prison reforms guaranteed inmates access to courts for any violations of their rights, limited sentences in all but the gravest cases to 15 years, and proclaimed rehabilitation to be the objective of incarceration. In 1977, a Sex Discrimination Act was passed. In 1981, a legal aid system was established to facilitate access to courts of law.

== Life after politics ==
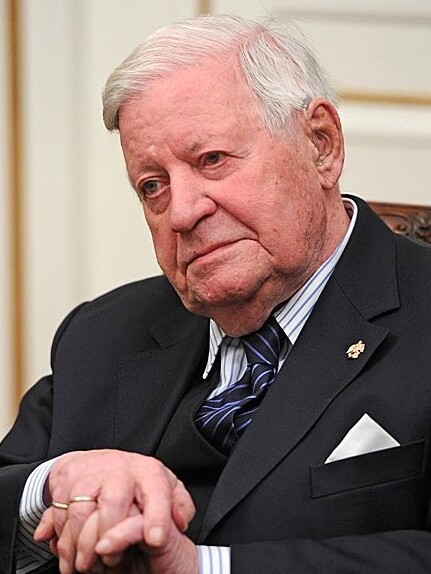
Schmidt in December 2013

In 1982, along with his friend Gerald Ford, he co-founded the annual AEI World Forum. The following year, he joined the nationwide weekly Die Zeit newspaper as co-publisher, also acting as its director from 1985 to 1989. In 1985, he became managing director. With Takeo Fukuda, he founded the Inter Action Councils in 1983. He retired from the Bundestag in 1986. In December 1986, he was one of the founders of the committee supporting the EMU and the creation of the European Central Bank.

Contrary to the line of his party, Schmidt was a determined opponent of Turkey's bid to join the EU. He also opposed phasing out nuclear energy, something that the Red-Green coalition of Gerhard Schröder supported. In 2007, Schmidt described the climate debate as "hysterically overheated". When asked about social media, Schmidt said he perceived the internet as "threatening". He was particularly concerned about the superficiality of communication on the web.

Schmidt was highly critical of allowing immigration from outside of Europe, believing that people from these cultures would not integrate well. He said in a 2004 interview with Hamburger Abendblatt that "a multicultural society can function peacefully only under a strong authoritarian state like Singapore, the cultures there all speak English and the political system is based on authority." In 2005, he spoke out against attempts to remedy Germany's aging population with more immigration: "Immigration of people from East of Anatolia or from Subsaharan Africa does not solve the problem, it only creates a much bigger problem." In a 2010 interview with Sandra Maischberger, he said that "Immigration from foreign civilisations creates more problems than it can bring us in terms of benefits on the labour market. Immigration from Europe is no problem; the problem starts from somewhat more eastern regions. These are different cultures, not because of their different genes or ancestry, but because of the way they were raised."

On 16 May 2014, Schmidt said the Russo-Ukrainian War was dangerous, because, "Europe, the Americans and also Russia are behaving in a way that Christopher Clark described in his book The Sleepwalkers: How Europe Went to War in 1914 that's very much worth reading, as the beginning of World War I: like sleepwalkers." Clark later disputed comparisons between the Russo-Ukrainian War and World War I, saying in 2022, "The first world war began in an incredibly complex, around-the-houses way. Whereas in the case of the invasion of Ukraine, in 2014 and this year, it's quite clearly a case of the breach of the peace by just one power."

Schmidt was the author of numerous books on his political life, on foreign policy, and political ethics. He made appearances in numerous television talk shows and remained one of the most renowned political publicists in Germany until his death.

In his later years, Schmidt gained a positive reputation as an elder statesman across party lines in Germany.

== Friendships ==
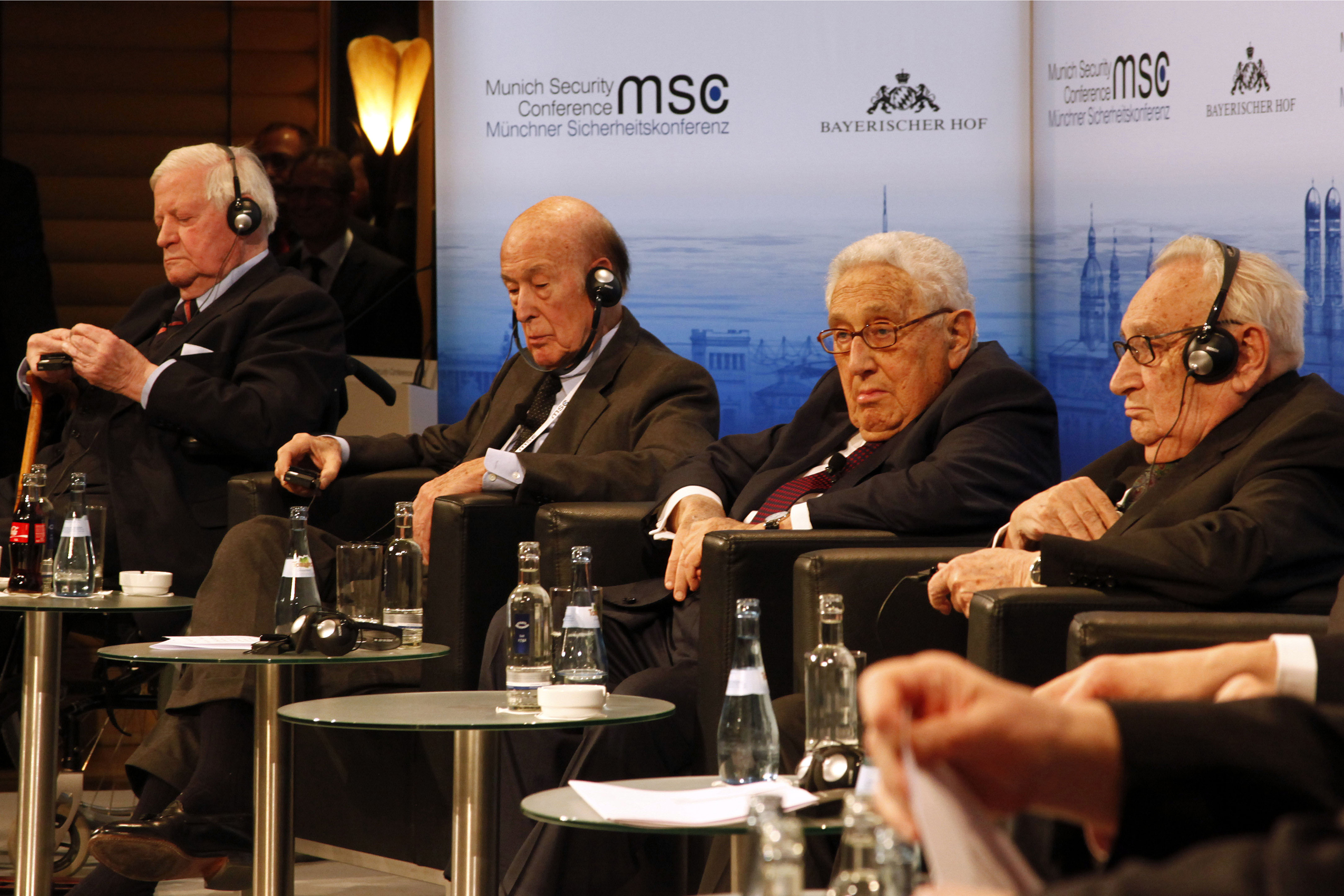
Schmidt with Valéry Giscard d'Estaing, Henry Kissinger and Egon Bahr (2014)

Schmidt described the assassinated Egyptian president Anwar Sadat as one of his friends from the world of politics, and maintained a friendship with ex-president Valéry Giscard d'Estaing of France. His circle also included former Singapore Prime Minister Lee Kuan Yew and former U.S. Secretaries of State George Shultz and Henry Kissinger. Kissinger went on record as stating that he wished to predecease Helmut Schmidt, because he would not wish to live in a world without him.

He was also good friends with former Canadian Prime Minister Pierre Trudeau. At the 4th G7 summit in 1978, the two discussed strategies for the upcoming Canadian federal election, and Schmidt gave him advice on economic policy. In 2011, Schmidt made a pilgrimage to the Trudeau family vault in St-Rémi-de-Napierville Cemetery, accompanied by Jean Chrétien and Tom Axworthy.

== Personal life ==
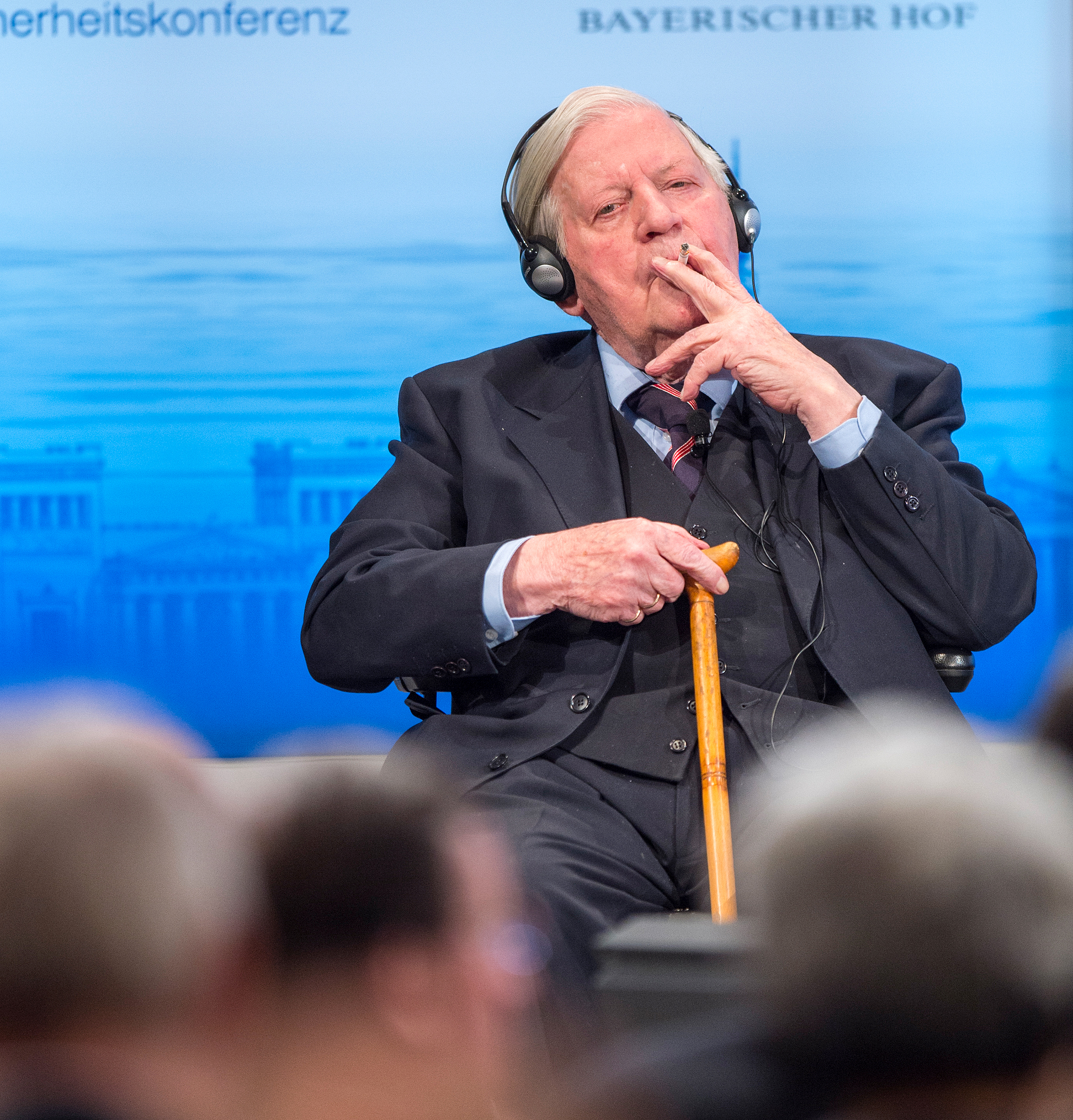
Schmidt smoking

Schmidt admired the philosopher Karl Popper, and contributed a foreword to the 1982 Festschrift in Popper's honour.

Schmidt was a talented pianist and recorded piano concertos of both Mozart and Bach with German pianist and conductor Christoph Eschenbach. Schmidt recorded Mozart's piano concerto for three pianos, K. 242, with the London Philharmonic Orchestra directed by Eschenbach in 1982 with pianists Eschenbach and Justus Frantz for EMI Records (CDC 7 47473 2). In that recording, according to the CDs liner notes, Schmidt played the part written for Countess Antonia Lodron's youngest daughter Giuseppina, "almost a beginner" who commissioned the work. The part brilliantly "enables any reasonably practised amateur to participate in a performance". The same musical notes also indicate that Schmidt and Frantz had played duets during Frantz's student days. In 1990 Schmidt joined Eschenbach, Frantz, Gerhard Oppitz and the Hamburg Philharmonic Orchestra in Deutsche Grammophon's recording of Bach's Concerto in A minor for four harpsichords, BWV 1065.

All his adult life, Schmidt was a heavy smoker. He was well known for lighting up during TV interviews and talk shows. On 13 October 1981, Schmidt was fitted with a cardiac pacemaker. On 24 August 2002, he suffered a heart attack and subsequently underwent bypass surgery.

On 25 January 2008, German police launched an inquiry after an anti-smoking initiative charged that Schmidt was defying the recently introduced smoking ban. The initiative claimed that Schmidt had been flagrantly ignoring anti-smoking laws. Despite pictures in the press, the case was subsequently dropped after the public prosecutor's office ruled that Schmidt's actions had not been a threat to public health.

On 6 April 2010, with a lifespan of 33,342 days, he surpassed Konrad Adenauer in terms of longevity, and at the time of his death was the oldest former chancellor in German history.

His wife of 68 years, Loki Schmidt, died on 21 October 2010, aged 91.

At the beginning of August 2012, Schmidt gave an interview on German television and revealed that at 93 years of age, he had fallen in love again. His new life partner was his associate of over 57 years, Ruth Loah (27 September 1933 – 23 February 2017).

== Illness, death and state funeral ==
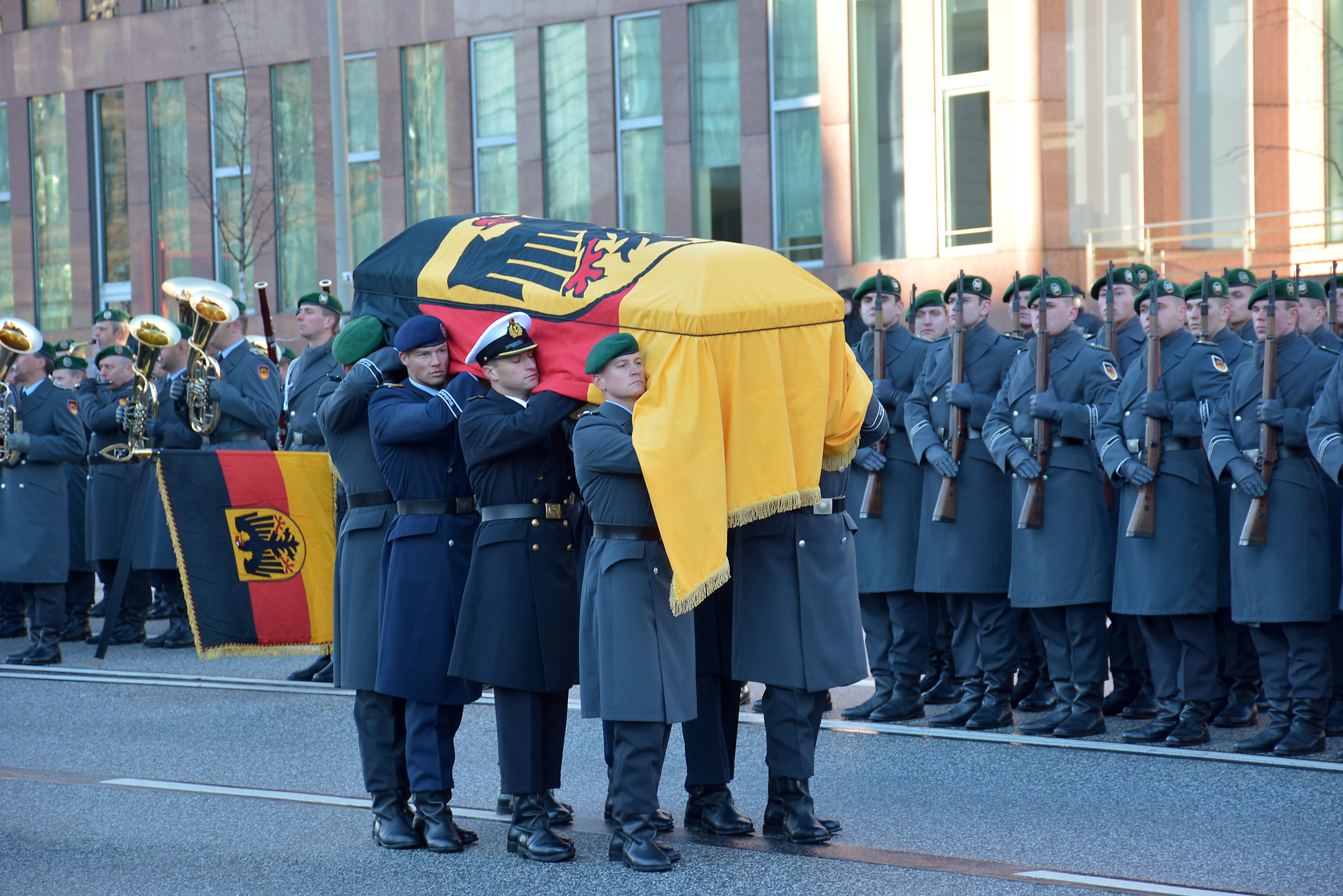
Schmidt's state funeral procession in Hamburg, 23 November 2015

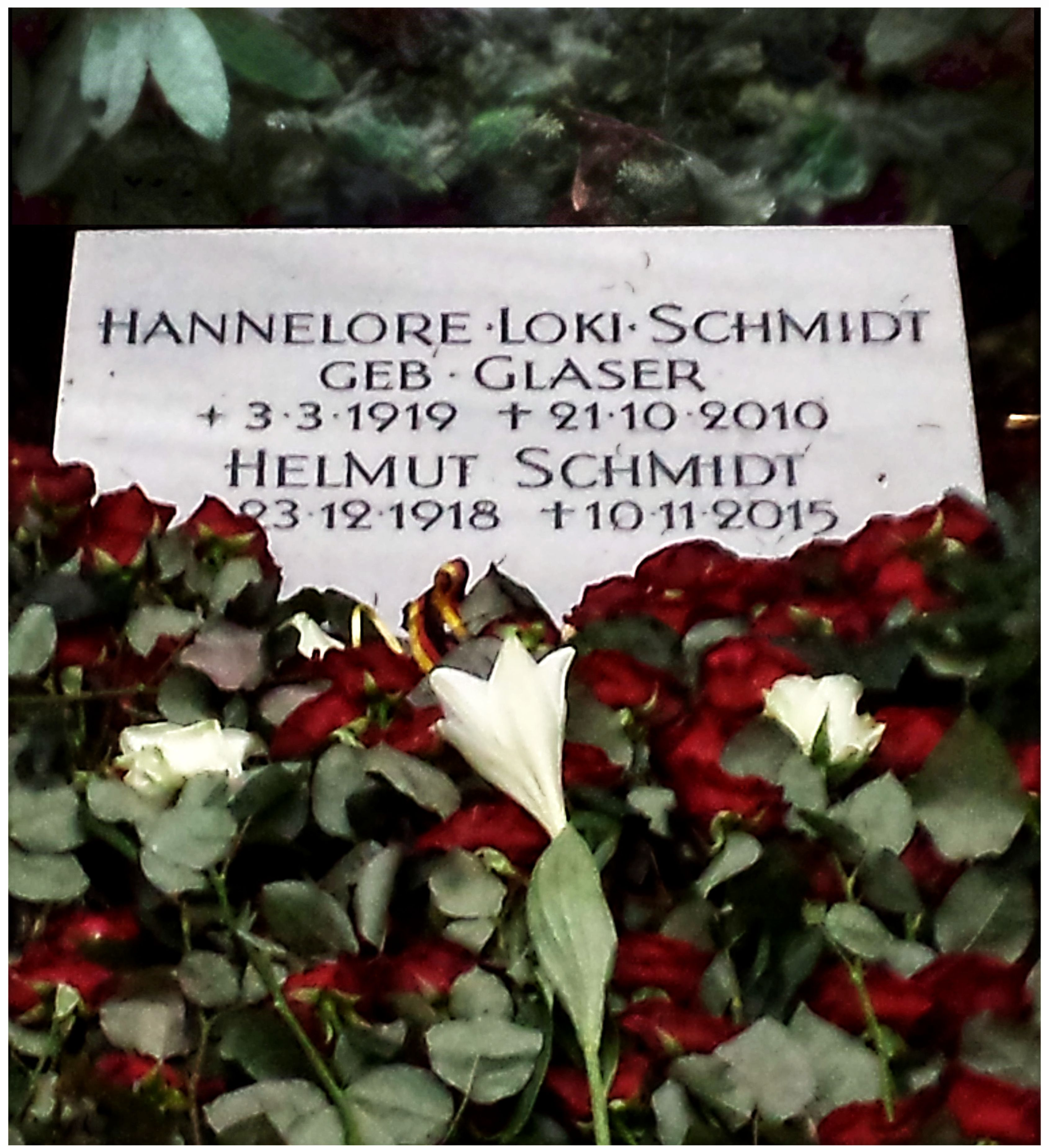
Tomb of Loki and Helmut Schmidt in the Ohlsdorf Cemetery

On 2 September 2015, Schmidt underwent surgery for a vascular occlusion in his right leg. On 17 September, he was discharged from hospital. After initial improvement, his condition worsened again on 9 November, with his doctor saying he "feared for the worst". Schmidt died in his Hamburg home on the afternoon of 10 November 2015, aged 96. At the time of his death, he was the longest-lived German Chancellor.

A state funeral for Schmidt was held on 23 November at the Protestant (Lutheran) St. Michael's Church, Hamburg, where Loki Schmidt's funeral had been held. German Chancellor Angela Merkel, in remarks to mourners, said, "He will be missed. He was an astute observer and commentator, and it was with good reason that he had a reputation for dependability." Others who spoke included former U.S. Secretary of State Henry Kissinger. Speaking in German, he lauded Schmidt for "vision and courage", based on the principles of "reason, law, peace and faith", and said Schmidt had been "a kind of world conscience".

Among the 1,800 who attended were German President Joachim Gauck, former U.S. Secretary of State Henry Kissinger and former French President Valéry Giscard d'Estaing, whose tenure in office paralleled Schmidt's as German chancellor. Other guests included former chancellor Gerhard Schröder, former presidents Christian Wulff, Horst Köhler, Roman Herzog and Hamburg's mayor Olaf Scholz. A flag-draped coffin containing the remains of the former chancellor, also a former German defense minister, was escorted by the German Army's Wachbataillon from St. Michael's to Ohlsdorf Cemetery for a private interment ceremony. Helmut Schmidt's remains were buried there one day later, in the family grave alongside the remains of his parents and his wife, Loki.

== Honours and awards ==
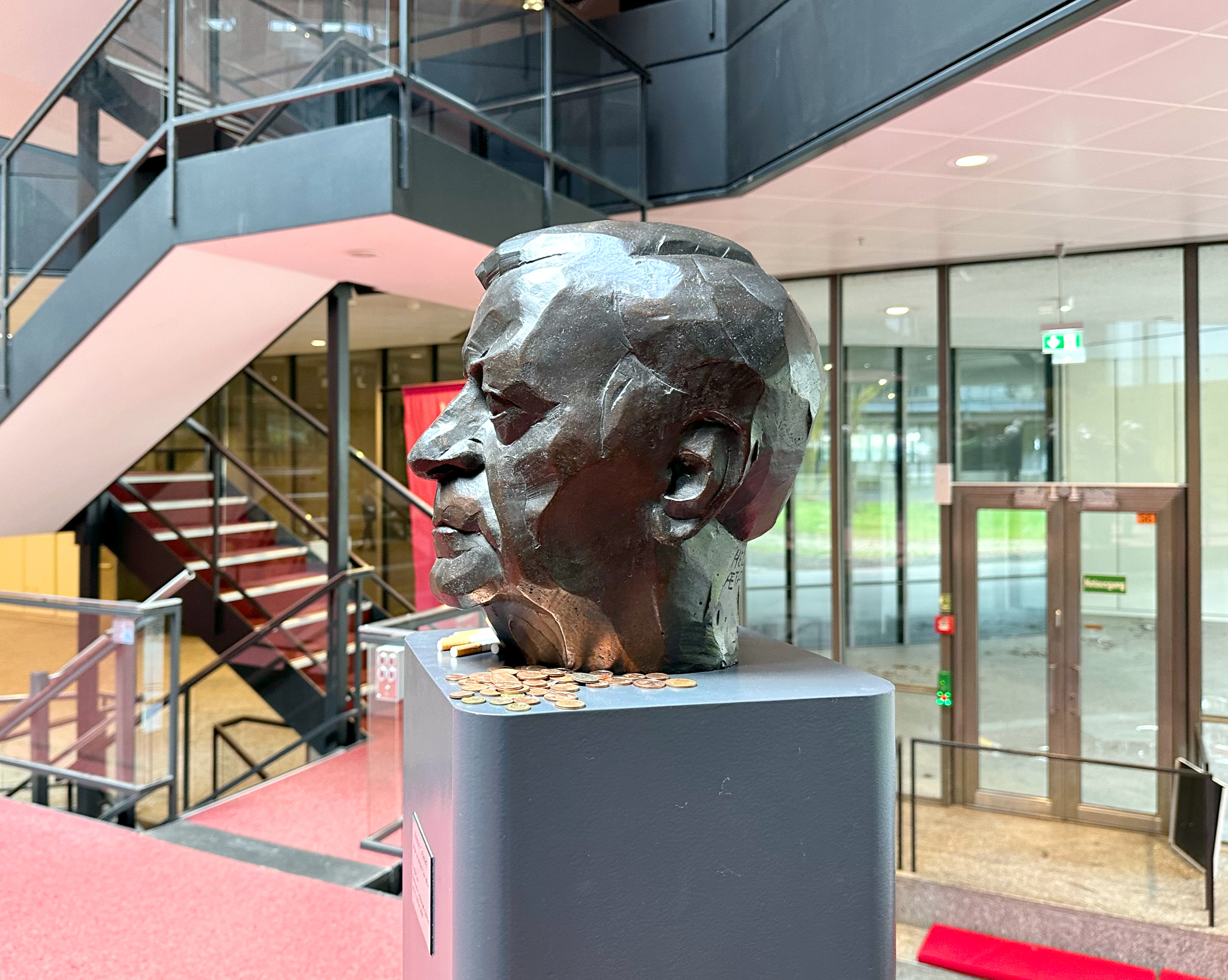
Bronze bust of Schmidt at the Helmut Schmidt University

Helmut Schmidt received a number of accolades. Among those offered was the Grand Cross Order of Merit of the Federal Republic of Germany, which he chose not to accept in Hanseatic tradition in line with the history of independence of Hamburg.

For its 30th anniversary, the University of the Federal Armed Forces Hamburg was renamed to Helmut Schmidt University – University of the Federal Armed Forces Hamburg in December 2003, in honour of Schmidt's tenure as minister of defence, during which he introduced mandatory academic education for line officers of the Bundeswehr – a reform that led to the establishment of the university in 1973. Prior to exams, students traditionally leave cigarettes or loose change at his bronze bust in the university's "Red Square" for good luck, in a nod to his signature chain-smoking.

In November 2016, Hamburg Airport was renamed "Hamburg Airport Helmut Schmidt" in his honour.

=== Freedom of the City ===
- 1983: Hamburg
- 1983: Bonn
- 1983: Bremerhaven
- 1989: Berlin
- 1995: Güstrow
- 1998: State of Schleswig-Holstein

=== Honorary degrees ===
Throughout his tenure as chancellor, and even thereafter, Helmut Schmidt received 24 honorary degrees. They include degrees from the British universities Oxford and Cambridge, Paris Sorbonne, the American Harvard and Johns Hopkins universities, the Belgian Katholieke Universiteit Leuven, and the Keio University in Japan.

=== Foundations ===
The Bundeskanzler-Helmut-Schmidt-Stiftung was established in 2016 by the German Bundestag as one of six non-partisan foundations commemorating politicians. It aims to honour Helmut Schmidt's historic achievements and to work on political issues Helmut Schmidt was concerned with throughout his political life and which have lost none of their relevance today. The foundation's headquarters are located in Hamburg.

=== Awards ===
- 1978: Theodor Heuss Prize for his crisis management in the time of RAF-Terror
- 1978: Peace Prize of the Louise Weiss Foundation in Strasbourg
- 1986: Athena Award of the Alexander S. Onassis Foundation
- 1988: Red Cross Four Freedoms Award
- 1989: Prize "The Political Book" award of the Friedrich Ebert Foundation for Men and Powers
- 1990: Friedrich-Schiedel-Literaturpreis for Men and Powers
- 1996: Spanish journalism prize Godo
- 1998: Carlo Schmid Prize
- 2001: Gold Medal of the Foundation Jean Monnet, for his dedication in the service of the European Monetary Union (together with his friend, the former French President Valéry Giscard d'Estaing)
- 2002: Martin Buber Plaque
- 2002: Dolf Sternberger Prize
- 2005: Prix des Generations of the initiative VIVA 50plus
- 2005: Oswald von Nell-Breuning Prize of the city of Trier
- 2005: Adenauer-de Gaulle Prize, for his work at the Franco-German cooperation (along with Valéry Giscard d'Estaing)
- 2007: Henry Kissinger Prize of the American Academy in Berlin
- 2007: Global Economy Prize of the Kiel Institute for the World Economy
- 2008: Osgar Media Award of the Bild Zeitung
- 2009: Leipzig International Mendelssohn Prize
- 2010: Point Alpha Prize
- 2010: Henri Nannen Prize for his journalistic lifetime achievement
- 2011: Millennium-Bambi
- 2012: Eric M. Warburg Prize
- 2012: Westphalian Peace Prize
- 2013: Hanns Martin Schleyer Prize. The Schleyer family's decision to award him this prize 36 years after Schleyer's death deeply moved him.
- 2014: German-French Journalists Prize
- 2015: Gustav Stresemann Prize of the Grand Lodge of Ancient Free and Accepted Masons of Germany

== Controversies over service in World War II ==
In 2017, after Minister of Defence Ursula von der Leyen issued an order to remove Wehrmacht memorabilia from barracks and other institutions of the Bundeswehr, a photo of the young Lieutenant Helmut Schmidt in Wehrmacht uniform was removed from the military's Helmut Schmidt University in Hamburg. Although the photo is now displayed again, the initial decision has caused a debate over Schmidt's service in the Wehrmacht. According to Der Spiegel, von der Leyen initially distanced herself from this decision, yet after a few days, she explained that Schmidt, as Minister of Defense and later Chancellor, was important in the formation of the Bundeswehr as a democratic army, but his time in the Wehrmacht had nothing to do with this. Historian Michael Wolffsohn argues that Schmidt avoided explaining about "what he had done between 1940 and 1945." He further comments that the whole Schmidt affair reveals that while the Bundeswehr is not "a state within a state", there is an uncritical milieu in the Bundeswehr that does not correspond to the spirit of the majority in the German society and might get larger if unchecked. He recommends that the photo be displayed again, but with explanations. Theo Sommer, a prominent journalist and former Chief of Planning Staff for the Ministry of Defence, while agreeing that the military leadership should pay attention to extremism within the Bundeswehr, criticises von der Leyen for her overreaction and Wolffsohn for false representation of Schmidt's attitude. According to Sommer, Schmidt had always been frank about his service on the Eastern Front: while he denied that he had ever seen or known about mass extermination of Jews in Russia, Schmidt admitted he often had to shoot at villages and then recognised the smell of burnt flesh. Schmidt said the troops were never taught about the Geneva Conventions, and by standards of today, he would have to go to court "a dozen times". According to Der Spiegel, Schmidt dated his departure from "idea and practice of National Socialism" to 1942 and his recognition of the criminal character of the regime to 1944.

== Books ==
=== Memoirs ===
External videos
- Booknotes interview with Schmidt on Men and Powers, 15 April 1990, C-SPAN

- Menschen und Mächte (Men and Powers), Siedler, Berlin 1987. Memoirs with a focus on Cold War politics.
- Die Deutschen und ihre Nachbarn (The Germans and Their Neighbours), Siedler, Berlin 1990. Strong focus on European politics.
- Kindheit und Jugend unter Hitler, mit Willi Berkhan et al. (Childhood and Youth Under Hitler). Siedler, Berlin 1992.
- Weggefährten (Companions), Siedler, Berlin 1996. Personal memoirs, with a focus on personal relations with domestic and foreign politicians.

=== Political books (selection) ===
- Schmidt, Helmut (1971). Balance of Power. Kimber. ISBN 978-0-7183-0112-5.
- —— (1984). The Soviet Union: Challenges and Responses as Seen from the European Point of View. Institute of Southeast Asian Studies. ISBN 978-9971-902-75-9.
- —— (1987). A Grand Strategy for the West: The Anachronism of National Strategies in an Interdependent World. Yale University Press. ISBN 978-0-300-04003-6.
- —— (1989). Men and Powers: A Political Retrospective. Random House. ISBN 978-0-394-56994-9.
- Schmidt, Helmut; Küng, Hans (1998). A Global Ethic and Global Responsibilities: Two Declarations. SCM Press. ISBN 978-0-334-02740-9.
- —— (2008). Bridging the Divide: Religious Dialogue and Universal Ethics. Queen's Policy Studies. ISBN 978-1-55339-220-0.
- —— (1998). Auf der Suche nach einer öffentlichen Moral [In Search of a Public Morality] (in German). Stuttgart: DVA.
- —— (2000). Die Selbstbehauptung Europas [The Self-Assertion of Europe]. Stuttgart: DVA.
- —— (2004). Die Mächte der Zukunft. Gewinner und Verlierer in der Welt von morgen [The Powers of the Future: Winners and Losers in the World of Tomorrow]. Munich: Siedler.
- Frank Sieren; Helmut Schmidt (1 September 2006). Nachbar China [Neighbour China]. Econ.
- —— (2008). Außer Dienst [Out of Service]. Munich: Siedler.

== Notes and references ==
=== References ===
German Bundestag
Preceded by Willy Max Rademacher	Member of the Bundestag for Hamburg-Nord II; 1957–1965	Succeeded by Rolf Meinecke
Proportional representation	Member of the Bundestag for Hamburg; 1953–1957; 1965–1969	Proportional representation
Preceded by Nikolaus Jürgensen	Member of the Bundestag for Hamburg-Bergedorf; 1969–1987	Succeeded by Rolf Niese
Political offices
Preceded by Wilhelm Kröger	Senator of the Interior of Hamburg; 1961–1965	Succeeded by Heinz Ruhnau
Preceded by Gerhard Schröder	Federal Minister of Defence; 1969–1972	Succeeded by Georg Leber
Preceded by Karl Schiller	Federal Minister for Economics; 1972	Succeeded by Hans Friderichs
Preceded by Karl Schiller	Federal Minister of Finance; 1972–1974	Succeeded by Hans Apel
Preceded by Willy Brandt	Chancellor of West Germany; 1974–1982	Succeeded by Helmut Kohl
Preceded by Anker Jørgensen	President of the European Council; 1978	Succeeded by Valéry Giscard d'Estaing
Preceded by Hans-Dietrich Genscher	Federal Minister for Foreign Affairs; Acting; 1982	Succeeded by Hans-Dietrich Genscher
Party political offices
Preceded by Fritz Erler	Bundestag Leader of the SPD Group; 1967–1969	Succeeded by Herbert Wehner
Diplomatic posts
Preceded by James Callaghan	Chair of the Group of 7; 1978	Succeeded by Masayoshi Ōhira
