= Loki Schmidt =

German environmentalist

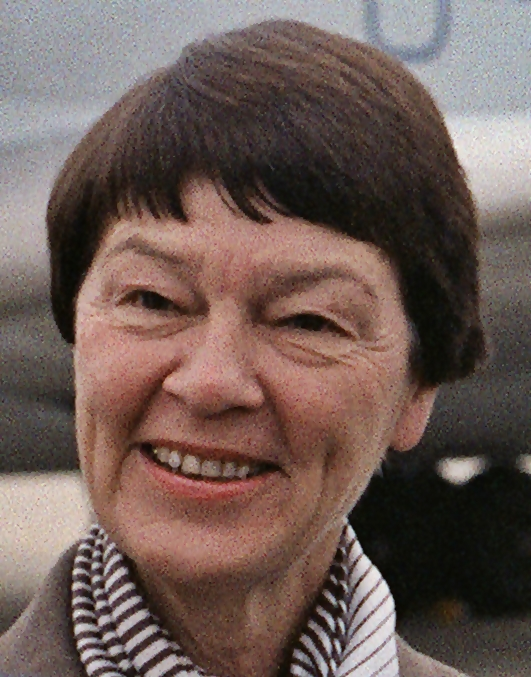
- Schmidt in 1981
- Born: Hannelore Glaser; 3 March 1919; Hamburg, Germany
- Died: 21 October 2010 (aged 91); Hamburg, Germany
- Resting place: Ohlsdorf Cemetery
- Occupation: Environmentalist
- Spouse: Helmut Schmidt (m. 1942)
- Children: 2

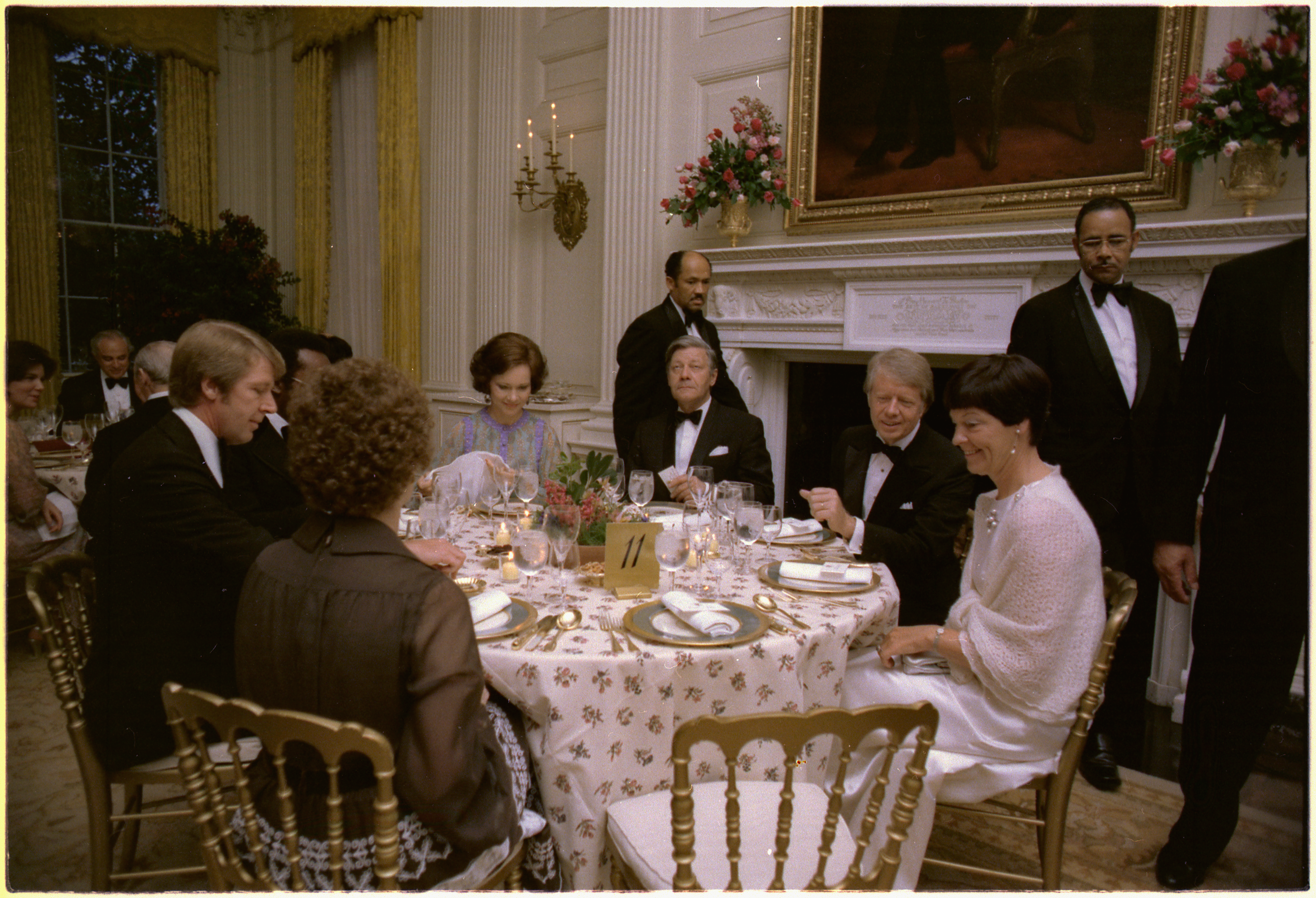
Schmidt as a companion of her husband (right from President Jimmy Carter) in the US, 1977

Hannelore "Loki" Schmidt (née Glaser; 3 March 1919 – 21 October 2010) was a German teacher and environmentalist. She was the wife of Helmut Schmidt, who was the Chancellor of Germany from 1974 to 1982.

== Life and work ==
Hannelore Glaser was born in 1919 in Hamburg. She studied four semesters of education. After graduation she worked as a school teacher continuously from 1940 until 1972 (teaching elementary school, Volksschule and Realschule). She married Helmut Schmidt in 1942. He became a politician who rose in 1974 to become Chancellor of West Germany.

In 1976, Loki Schmidt founded the Stiftung zum Schutze gefährdeter Pflanzen (engl.: foundation for the protection of endangered plants), which later became the Stiftung Naturschutz Hamburg und Stiftung zum Schutze gefährdeter Pflanzen (engl.: nature conservancy foundation Hamburg for the protection of endangered plants).

In 1980, she established the Flower of the Year campaign, a public awareness campaign for the protection of endangered wildflowers in Germany. For this work she was awarded the title Professor by the University of Hamburg. She was an honorary doctor of the Russian Academy of Science in St. Petersburg and the University of Hamburg.

The new botanical garden in Hamburg was renamed after her to "Loki-Schmidt-Garten" in 2012.

She was buried in the Ohlsdorf Cemetery.

== Legacy ==
The Puya loki-schmidtiae, the Pitcairnia loki-schmidtiae and the scorpion Tityus lokiae are named in her honour.

== Family ==
Loki and Helmut Schmidt married on 27 June 1942; they had a son (who died as an infant) and a daughter.

== Later years ==
In 2009, she was awarded the honorary citizen award (Ehrenbürgerschaft)—the highest decoration—of Hamburg. She died during the night of 20/21 October 2010, aged 91, at her home in Langenhorn, after 68 years of marriage to Helmut Schmidt.

== Publications ==
- Schützt die Natur: Impressionen aus unserer Heimat. Herder Verlag, 1979, ISBN 3-451-18225-4.
- H.-U. Reyer, W. Migongo-Buke und L. Schmidt: Field Studies and Experiments on Distribution and Foraging of Pied and Malachite Kingfishers at Lake Nakuru (Kenya). In: Journal of Animal Ecology, Band 57, 1988, S. 595–610, Zusammenfassung, ISSN 0021-8790.
- W. Barthlott, S. Porembski, M. Kluge, J. Hopke und L. Schmidt: Selenicereus wittii (Cactaceae). An epiphyte adapted to Amazonian Igapó inundation forests. In: Plant Systematics and Evolution, Band 206, 1997, S. 175–185, ISSN 0378-2697.
- Die Botanischen Gärten in Deutschland. Verlag Hoffmann und Campe, 1997, ISBN 3-455-11120-3.
- Die Blumen des Jahres. Verlag Hoffmann und Campe, 2003, ISBN 3-455-09395-7.
- P. Parolin, J. Adis, M. F. da Silva, I. L. do Amaral, L. Schmidt und M. T. F. Piedade: Floristic composition of a floodplain forest in the Anavilhanas archipelago, Brazilian Amazonia. In: Amazoniana, Band 17 (3/4), 2003, S. 399–411, Abstract, ISSN 0065-6755.
- Loki: Hannelore Schmidt erzählt aus ihrem Leben. Verlag Hoffmann und Campe, 2003, ISBN 3-455-09408-2.
- Mein Leben für die Schule. 2005, ISBN 3-455-09486-4
- Erzähl doch mal von früher: Loki Schmidt im Gespräch mit Reinhold Beckmann. Verlag Hoffman und Campe, 2008, ISBN 3-455-50094-3.
