= Kreuzbau (Hamburg) =

Kreuzbau buildings in Hamburg

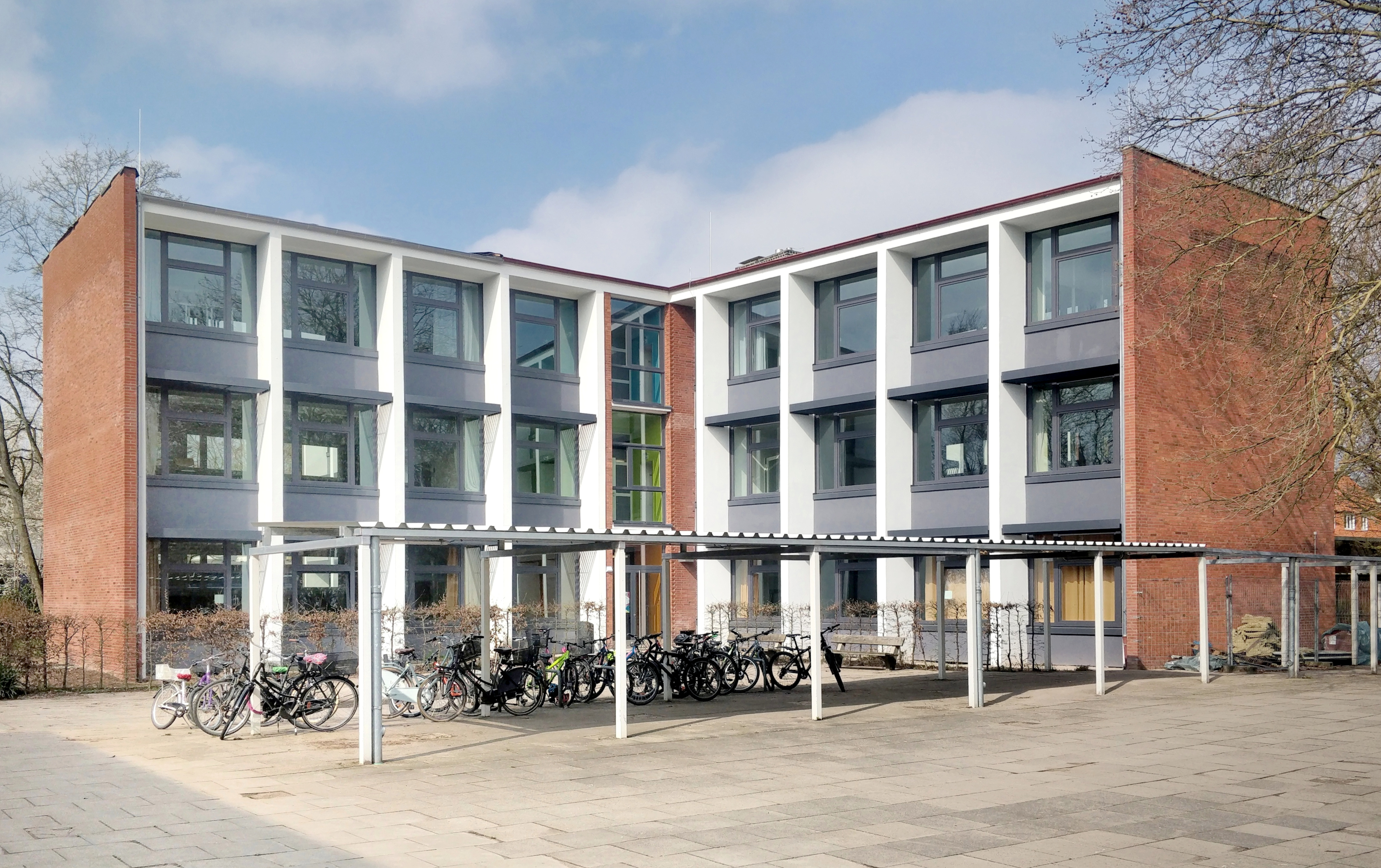
Renovated Kreuzbau at the Gymnasium Corveystraße, southeast side with two main window walls

The Kreuzbau (also Klassenkreuz) is a building type for school buildings in Hamburg. Between 1957 and 1963, Kreuzbau buildings were erected there at a good 60 locations of state schools. They have four wings on a cruciform ground plan, from which the name is derived. The Kreuzbau building has three floors and a flat roof. Each floor has four classrooms and associated small group rooms, which means that the Kreuzbau building can accommodate twelve school classes. The classrooms are directly accessed by a central staircase - without a corridor and in the way of Schustertyp. The design for the Kreuzbau building came from the Hamburg building director Paul Seitz. The main advantage of this type of building was its rapid assembly; from today's perspective, its disadvantage is its lack of thermal insulation. More than 80% of the Kreuzbau buildings erected in Hamburg are still standing and mostly serve elementary schools as classrooms.

== History ==
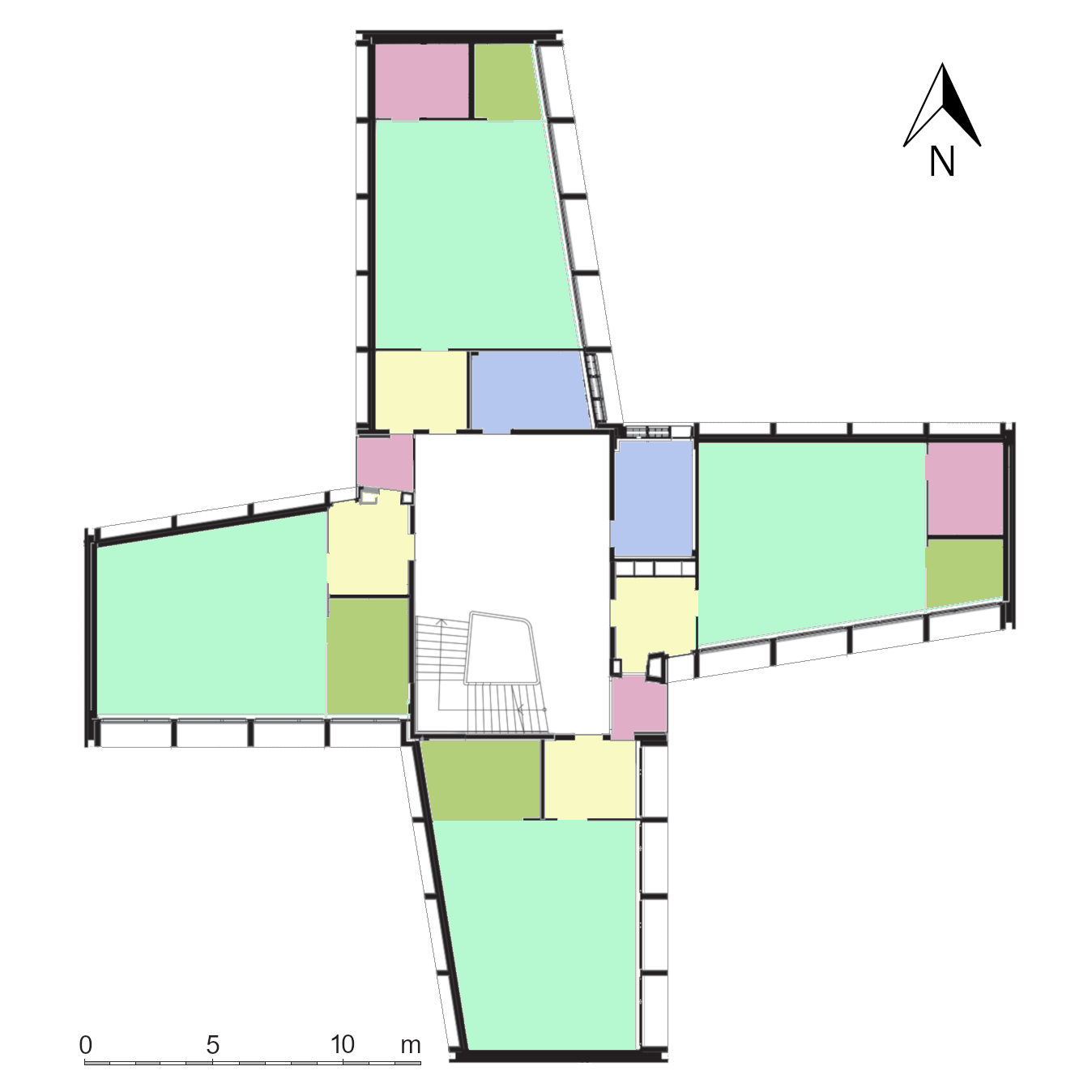
Schematic floor plan with type of use: 1Staircase / 4Anteroom / wardrobe; 2Classrooms / 5WC / Washrooms; 3Group rooms / 6Escape routes / stairs

=== Antecedents ===
After the end of World War II, almost half of Hamburg's former 463 school buildings were no longer usable: 21% of the schools were destroyed and 26% were so badly damaged that they could hardly be used. From 1945 to 1947, the number of students in Hamburg doubled from 95,000 to 186,000. The reasons for this increase were the return of families from the 1943 evacuation after the "Feuersturm," including students returning from the "Kinderlandverschickung." The settlement of 1944–50 flight and expulsion of Germans and refugees from the Soviet occupation zone had a reinforcing effect. Until 1948, school construction was limited to makeshift repairs of damage and the use of shacks and other temporary facilities. The shortage of space could only be met by "shift teaching."

This situation generated considerable public pressure, since parents' gainful employment was severely hampered by staggered shift teaching of several children. In Hamburg's state politics, the shortage of space in schools was, along with the housing shortage, the irritant par excellence and contributed to the SPD's loss of its majority in the 1953 Hamburg elections, even though top candidate Max Brauer promised the completion of one new school per month in the election program "A flourishing Hamburg." The winner of the 1953 elections was the bourgeois Hamburg Block, which used the issue of the lack of school buildings to stop the school reform pushed by the SPD. But that did not change the urgent task of multiplying the pace of school construction. At the same time, however, the city's resources were limited - there were enough other expensive tasks in housing construction and industrial settlement.

In 1952, Paul Seitz was appointed First Director of Construction and Head of the Structural Engineering Office in Hamburg, and thus also Deputy to the Senior Director of Construction at the Hamburg Building Authority, Werner Hebebrand. Seitz held these posts until 1963, when he left Hamburg for a professorship at the Berlin University of the Arts. Seitz designed mainly schools, university buildings and other public buildings during his ten-year tenure. For schools, he relied entirely on serial designs that were used according to the modular principle. In doing so, he pursued two concepts: the "Green School" and the "wachsenden Schule."

The Green School was intended to realize ideas of the new education movement of a return to nature by placing smaller school buildings with a maximum of two stories on generously sized school grounds in the green, ideally with direct access to the garden from the classroom. This type of construction deliberately stood out from the imposing "school barracks" of the Wilhelminism Period and was intended to appear transparent and light. The dimensions of these buildings were to have a human scale, a deliberate contrast to the old school buildings in which a "whole generation was drilled in racial ideological and militaristic values." It is true that school construction was not the focus of Nazi architecture, since hardly any new schools were planned and completed between 1933 and 1945. However, the new school buildings were also intended to express a turning away from the secondary virtues that had made the Nazi state and world war possible.

The "wachsenden Schule" was to be available quickly and then grow with the needs of the school. Initially, this concept also called for school buildings to be easily relocatable, and was accompanied by the abandonment of costly foundations and basements. The first series of pavilion schools was built in Hamburg according to this concept; a much-noted prototype for this type of construction at the time is the listed Mendelssohnstraße school in Bahrenfeld. The serial construction developed in the process was the pavilion type A, made of lightweight materials by Polensky & Zöllner. By 1961, 459 new classrooms of this type had been erected.

=== Design phase ===
The design task for Seitz and his working group in the structural engineering department was clear: How could new school construction in Hamburg be drastically accelerated despite a labour shortage of skilled workers and budget constraints without abandoning the ideals of the Green School"? What could a series design look like that would also work on smaller or denser school sites? And how would this serial design have to be designed in order to represent all functions of a school as a nucleus of a "wachsenden Schule" already in the first construction phase? The answer to these questions was the Kreuzbau building.

The labour shortage of skilled workers in the construction industry was a major obstacle to accelerating the school building program. Conventional buildings needed skilled masons, foremen, scaffolders, and roofers. Public school construction competed for these skilled workers with residential construction and the private sector. The use of precast concrete reduced the need for such skilled workers on the job site, while the quick 15-day erection time allowed the erection crew to move on, after which the build-out continued. The standardized school construction reduced the need for skilled workers in the shell construction phase to specially trained assemblers - the construction time was already reduced to one fifth by the "Pavilion A" assembly system.

The pavilion schools were cheap and quick to build, but they usually had only one or at most two stories, and a correspondingly high land consumption. This required a plot size of at least 24,000 m^{2} for an Volksschule with the usual class frequency of the time. This was still possible in the planned new development areas in the expansion areas of Hamburg (e.g. Rahlstedt and Bramfeld), but in densification areas such as Wilhelmsburg and Wandsbek or to replace war-damaged school buildings near the inner city, as in Horn and Hamm, these plot sizes were not available. In addition, it became apparent that the influx and birth rates in the new development areas were higher than expected, so that the already designed schools had to accommodate higher numbers of students. A classroom building of more than two stories with a good ratio of usable to circulation space was essential to achieve the necessary space efficiency.

In response to the design task, Seitz developed the Kreuzbau building starting in 1955. The three-story arrangement made better use of the land than a single-story pavilion. In addition, the direct access to the classrooms from the staircase resulted in a very favorable ratio of 80% usable space to 20% circulation space. However, the lowest grades of a school were still to be housed in pavilions accessible at ground level. The design relied heavily on precast concrete elements and placed great emphasis on rapid erectability. The small heating cellar with oil-fired heating made it possible to start school operations immediately, even in winter, regardless of progress in further construction phases.

In 1955/56, a pre-series type of the Klassenkreuz was built for the school at St. Catherine's Church. This prototype, in contrast to the series production, had four floors, because the plot of land at the Katharinenkirchhof was only 7,000 m^{2} and thus lacked space for the erection of further school buildings. The school at the St. Catherine's Church was listed as a historical monument, but was nevertheless demolished in 2011 in favor of the newly to be built "St. Catherine's Quarter". The school is located at the Katharinenkirchhof.

=== Construction phase ===
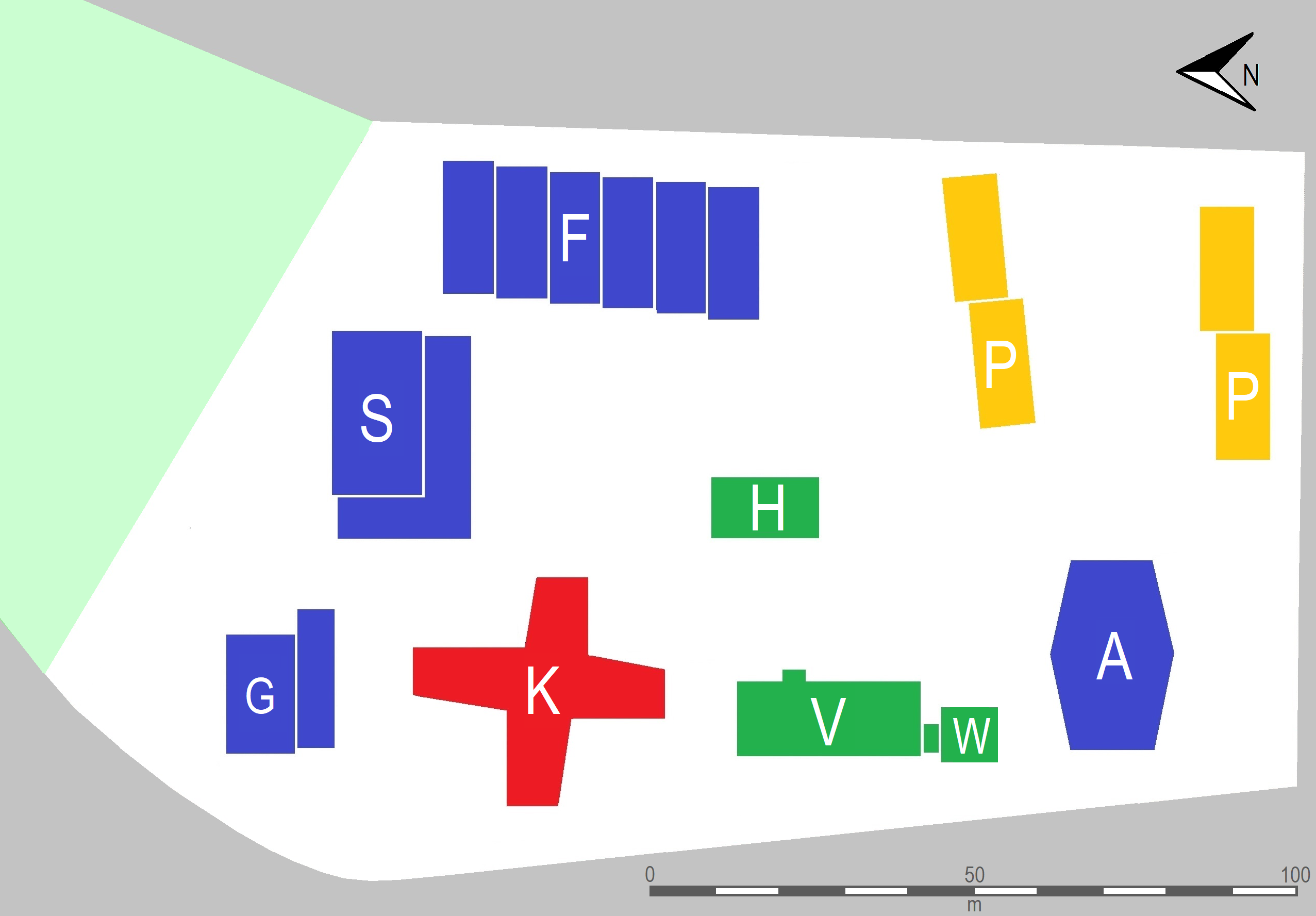
Scheme of the "wachsenden Schule" with construction stages: 1 Kreuzbau 2 Pavilions 3 Administration, janitor's apartment, break hall 4 Technical wing, gymnasium, gymnastics hall, auditorium

From now on, the Klassenkreuz was to serve as the centerpiece and first construction phase of the "wachsenden Schule". After it was erected, classes could begin immediately in the Kreuzbau building, while other school buildings were added all around. Ideally, the following sequence was typical:

- First construction phase: Klassenkreuz
- Second construction phase: classrooms with differentiation rooms in pavilions
- Third construction phase: administration rooms, janitor's apartment, common room / break hall
- Fourth phase of construction: classrooms, gymnasium (side hall), smaller gymnasium, auditorium

The space available in the Klassenkreuz was in accordance with the specifications of the Room and Furnishing Program for Hamburg Schools of 1958. The production of the prefabricated parts for the Kreuzbau buildings was entrusted to the "Arbeitsgemeinschaft Kreuzschulen," which consisted of Polensky & Zöllner and Paul Thiele AG.

The prototype at the St. Catherine's Church was accepted on August 9, 1957. Four more approvals of Kreuzbau buildings followed before the end of August 1957. Based on the experience of the first series of ten, the construction time for a Kreuzbau building was half a year, half of a "normal" school building. The planned cost would be 670,000 marks per Kreuzbau building. At the end of August 1957, school inspector Dressel announced that the new construction method would eliminate the school space shortage in Hamburg in four to five years.

In October 1961, the topping out ceremony for the 50th Kreuzbau building was celebrated at the Gymnasium Corveystrasse. On October 21, 1963, the last Kreuzbau building was accepted at Krohnstieg. In just over six years, the type had been built 67 times in Hamburg, resulting in 796 classrooms. Kreuzbau buildings were also erected outside Hamburg, for example in a modified form at the Gottfried-Röhl Elementary School in Berlin, built between 1961 and 1964. In Freiburg im Breisgau, nine Kreuzbau buildings based on Hamburg's design were built by 1976 at school sites in new housing estates to the west of the city center.

From the early 1960s, school construction in Hamburg could no longer keep up with the pace of new housing construction. In Bramfeld, shift teaching was reintroduced in 1961 in the newly built Hegholt housing estate, and in 1965, Wilhelm Dressel, the school inspector responsible for school construction, publicly announced that they had "lost the race with the new housing developments". As an emergency solution, "classrooms and more classrooms" had to be built in the outlying districts, and the construction of gymnasiums, break halls, subject rooms, and auditorium buildings was postponed.

While new school construction proceeded in absolute numbers throughout the city, the "growing school" concept faltered at individual school sites, or led to growth from the mid-1960s onward only in classroom buildings of the newer "Type-65", "Honeycomb construction," and "Type-68" ("Double-H") series. Gymnasiums were not built at some sites until ten years after the opening of the school, and auditorium buildings were rarely built. The need for specialized rooms was concentrated at secondary schools after the abolition of VolksSchule in 1964; many of the Kreuzbau school sites of the early 1960s are now elementary schools.

Across the various types of buildings, the Hamburg school construction program was "unique in scope" compared to other large West German cities. Nowhere else in the Federal Republic of Germany did new schools between 1950 and 1980 rely so heavily on assembly and type buildings as in Hamburg, accompanied by the extensive abandonment of individual designs. In the German-speaking world, this is surpassed only by the type school construction in the GDR.

== Description ==
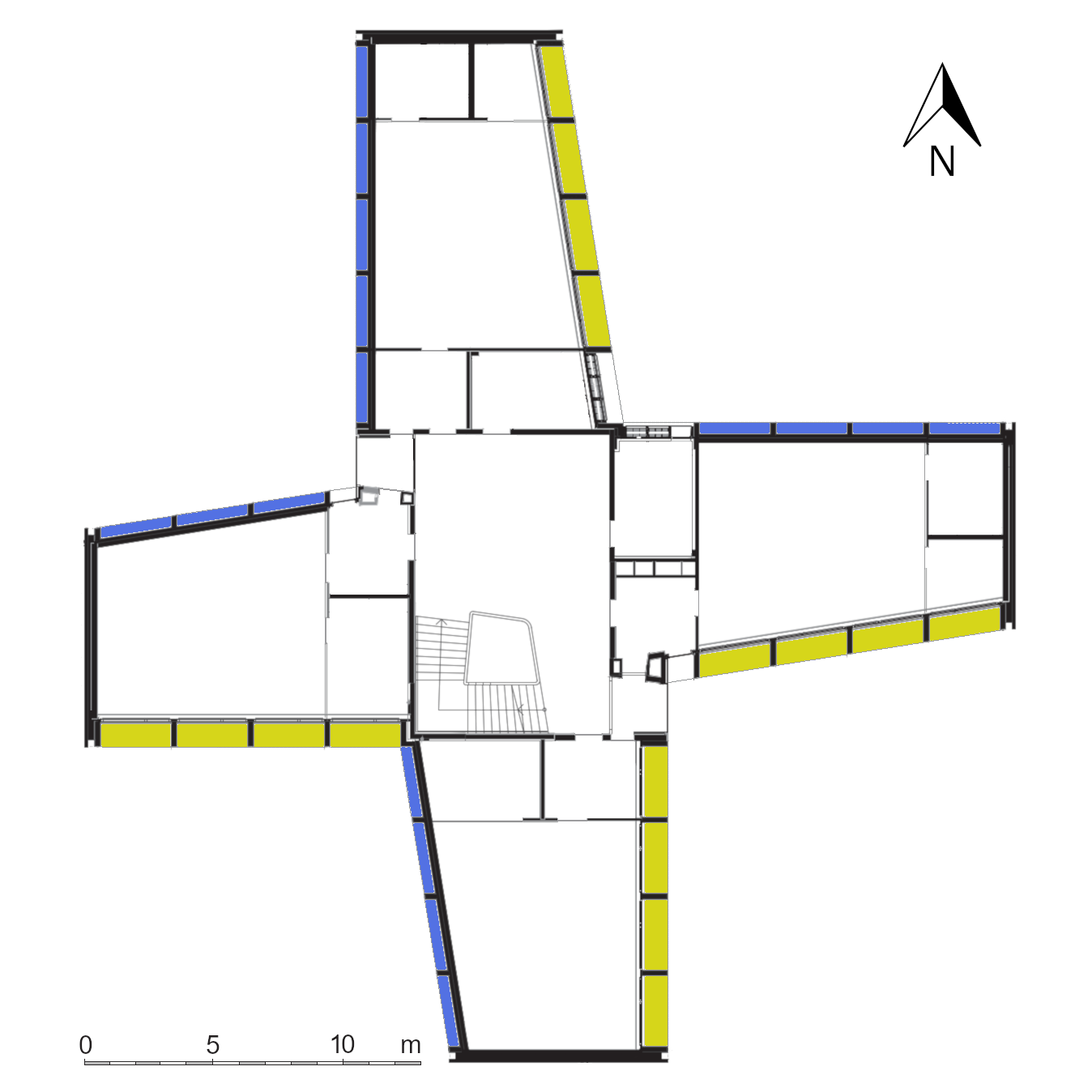
Window fronts (display aligned) 1Main window wall 2 Side window wall

The Kreuzbau building is a three-story building with a cruciform floor plan. There are four classrooms on each floor, which are accessed through a central stairwell without corridors. From the stairwell, the schoolchild reaches his or her classroom through a small anteroom that serves as a checkroom. Each classroom is assigned a smaller differentiation room, which is separated by a glass wall. The classrooms are between 65 and 68 m^{2}, the differentiation rooms between 8 and 11 m^{2}. In addition, there are WC rooms on each floor.

=== Room layout ===
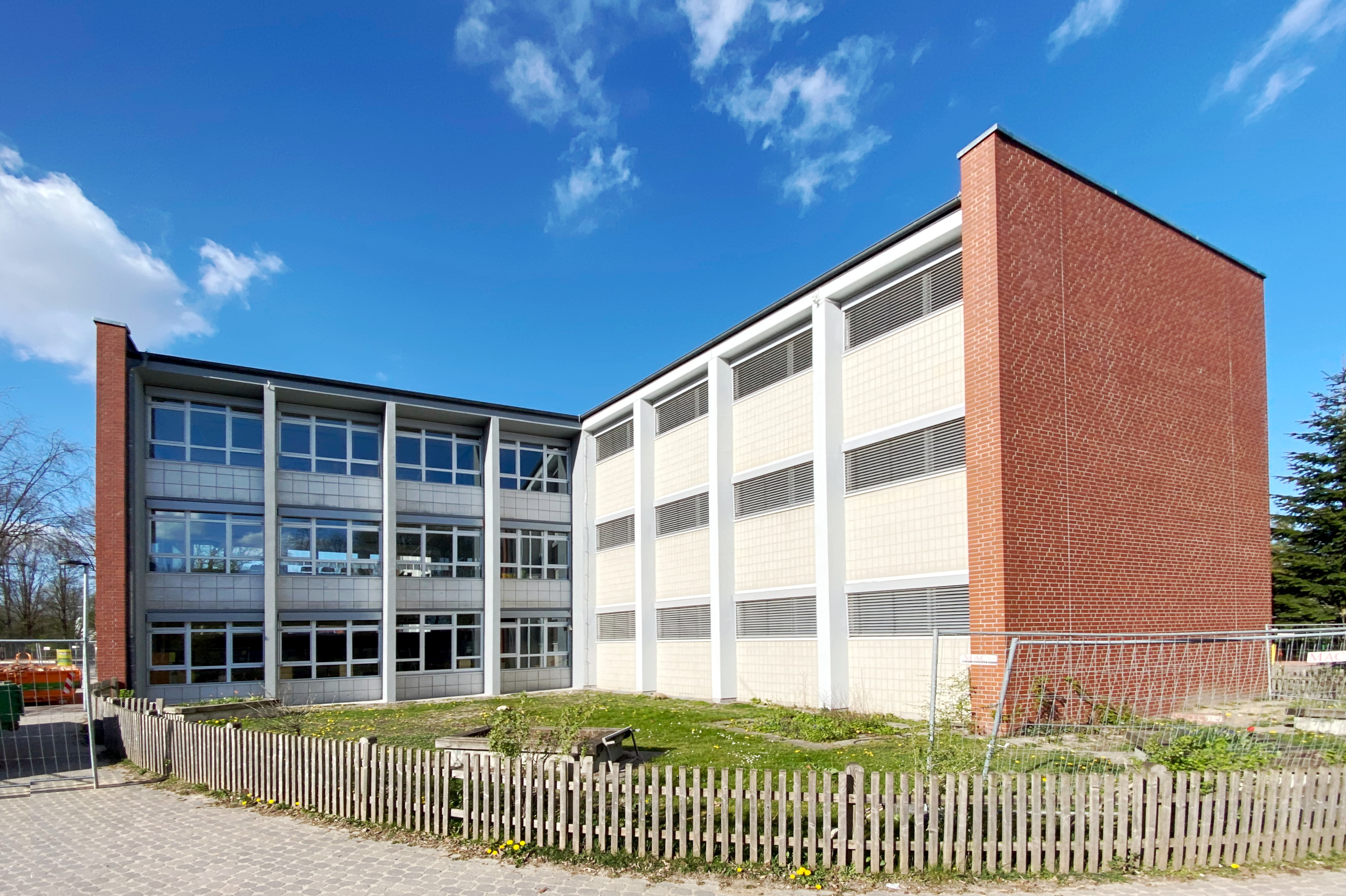
West wing with main window wall (left) and south wing with secondary window wall as well as front side with exposed masonry (right)

The ground plan of this type of building is not axial symmetry. The shape of the Kreuzbau building floor plan is sometimes compared to the wings of a windmill because the surfaces of the wings are laterally displaced with respect to the center of rotation. However, unlike the windmill, the Kreuzbau building floor plan is also not rotationally symmetrical because the wings are not equal in length. This results from the fact that the wings are "pushed" into the floor plan of the stairwell to different extents, because only two wings accommodate the WC rooms and emergency stairwells and are correspondingly longer. In the usual arrangement, the north wing protrudes furthest from the building at about 17 m, while the shortest wing at about 12 m is either the west wing (right tapered variant) or the east wing (left tapered variant).

The floor plan of each classroom is in the shape of a rectangular trapezoid. In each of the four wings, one side extends from the stairwell at a right angle, while the other side of the wing tapers toward the front. The tapered side is the same for each wing; in some Kreuzbau buildings it is always the right side, in others it is always the left side. The four end faces are always parallel to the staircase.

The depth of the classrooms is up to 8 m. With an economical room height, this requires two-sided lighting, which also enables vertical transverse flow system of ventilation. Typologically, the Klassenkreuz is thus a cobbler type, since there are no corridors and each classroom is lit and ventilated from two sides. Each classroom has a main window wall with tall windows and, opposite, a secondary window wall with a light-diffusing glazed window band just below the ceiling. The panel wall is always the front of the building.

If the particular plot of land allowed it, the Kreuzbau building was always placed with maximum use of sunlight: The main window wall of the east and west wings faces south, while for the north and south wings it faces east. Thus, when two wings are viewed, there is a characteristic sequence of the main and secondary window walls, from which the cardinal direction of the respective wing is derived.

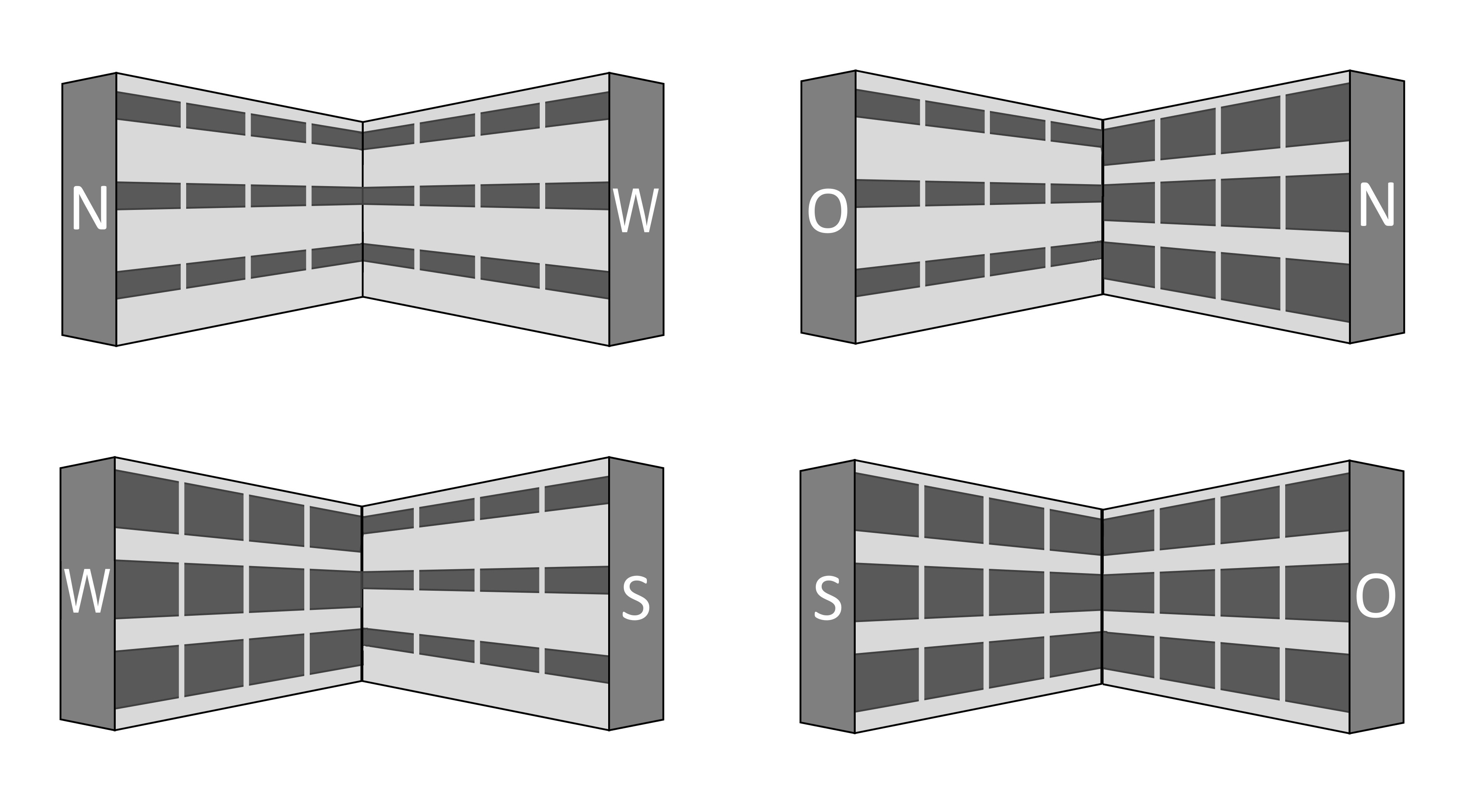
Scheme of window walls and orientation of sashes

=== Development ===
The concept of the pavilion school provides for a loose, organic arrangement of the building structures on a generous plot, which are connected to each other by means of open arcades. These arcades were regularly used in Hamburg schools of the 1950s and early 1960s. These arcades were designed as elevated flat roofs supported by unadorned tubular frames. In Hamburg, the arcades usually have a clear height of little more than two meters and connect to the pavilions at the upper end of the doorway.

Apart from the emergency exits, the Kreuzbau building has two entrances. These are located at the point of the abutting wings, one entrance on the southeast side and the other entrance diagonally opposite on the northwest side. Thus, one entrance is located between two secondary window walls and the other entrance between two main window walls. Due to the height of the windows in relation to the height of the pergolas, only the northwest entrance can be connected to the pergola system, where the pergola roof surface can be routed below the bottom edge of the secondary window band. At the lower reaching main windows, the roof would otherwise run in front of the window area. Many Kreuzbau buildings are not (no longer) connected to the arcade system at their locations at all.

Behind the not particularly wide glass entrance door, a lobby leads into the central stairs. The lobby on the first floor is placed in the same position in the floor plan as the escape connecting corridors on the two upper floors, which serve as a separate escape route there. The stairs has a rectangular shape with its long side oriented in the direction of the north–south axis. The actual stairs located in the southwest corner of the stairs and leads to the next floor with two flights of stairs at right angles to each other over a landing. The stairwellhas the shape of a kite with strongly rounded corners. Together with the narrow metal handrails, this design looks very typical of the 1950s. The stairs are interior, so it has no windows. Although both the entrance doors on the first floor and the escape connecting corridors on the upper floors are glazed, they are on both sides of the vestibule or corridor. As a result, not an excessive amount of daylighting enters the stairwell. Two circular skylights are incorporated in the roof window for additional lighting.

The fire protection concept of the Kreuzbau building provides that the main escape route leads through the stairwell, which thus forms the "necessary stairs". In addition to this main stairwell, there are two emergency stairwells located on the front sides of the north and west wings, from where they lead to the outside via lateral emergency exits. Each classroom therefore has a second escape route, either by direct connection to an emergency stairwell or by an escape connecting corridor to an adjacent classroom from where an emergency stairwell can be reached. The escape connecting corridor is separated from the main stairwell in a smoke-tight manner. This concept corresponded to the building police regulation of 1938 valid at the time of construction, which was confirmed in 1957 and 1958 in consultations of all responsible expert commissions (so-called "theater commission"). In 1961, the building police approval took place, which was again confirmed by the building regulation office in 1974. First, Kreuzbau buildings of the series "K1 V1" were erected. In this first series, the two emergency stairwells at the end faces of the north and west wings are glazed. Later series were less elaborate, and the emergency stairwells are still present but no longer visible from the outside.

=== Interior ===
In 2012, Hamburg's Office for the Protection of Historical Monuments commissioned a survey of the post-war buildings of the Uferstraße Vocational School, which included a Kreuzbau building, an eight-classroom wing and an administration building. This ensemble was listed in 1973 together with the buildings by Fritz Schumacher. In the process, the following original design of the Kreuzbau building was worked out:

The interiors of the Kreuzbau building were designed on the vertical surfaces with glass elements, floor-to-ceiling wooden panels and light yellow exposed brickwork. These surfaces were articulated both vertically and horizontally. The ceilings of the rooms were clad with rectangular acoustic panels framed with simple wood trim at the transition to the wall surfaces. The doors leading from the stairwell were recessed into wood-clad wall surfaces and designed with exposed wood. The radiators and inner doors of the WCs were painted in a light yellow-red color. The doors leading from the classrooms were also designed with exposed wood and had glass panels. The slenderly designed staircase was finished in Béton brut, and the handrail was made of metal. The floor was covered with dark, iridescent floor tiles.

The classrooms were equipped with mobile chairs and desks, which was in contrast to the rigid school desks of the pre-war period. Fixed rooms were equipped with sound-absorbing ceiling paneling and built-in cabinets.

More than half of the Kreuzbau buildings were equipped with artworks purchased with funds from the "Art in Construction" program of the building authority. Most of these were murals or reliefs in the stairwells. Hamburg artists funded in this way included (street names of demolished Kreuzbau buildings (as of 2020) in italics): Ulrich Beier (Stephanstraße), Gerhard Brandes (Walddörferstraße), Annette Caspar (Potsdamer Straße), Jens Cords (Schenefelder Landstraße, Fahrenkrön), Hanno Edelmann (An der Berner Au), Arnold Fiedler (Alsterredder), Heinz Glüsing (Beltgens Garten), Erich Hartmann (Vermoor), Helmuth Heinsohn (Wesperloh), Volker Detlef Heydorn (Windmühlenweg), Fritz Husmann (Sanderstraße), Diether Kressel (Brucknerstraße, Humboldtstrasse), Nanette Lehmann (Fährstrasse), Max Hermann Mahlmann (Heinrich-Helbing-Strasse), Maria Pirwitz (Schimmelmannstrasse), Ursula Querner (Benzenbergweg), Albert Christoph Reck (Rahlaukamp), Walter Siebelist (An der Berner Au), Herbert Spangenberg (Stockflethweg), Eylert Spars (Francoper Straße, Hanhoopsfeld, Krohnstieg), Hans Sperschneider (Hinsbleek), Hann Trier (Struenseestraße) and Johannes Ufer (Neubergerweg).

=== Building construction and assembly ===
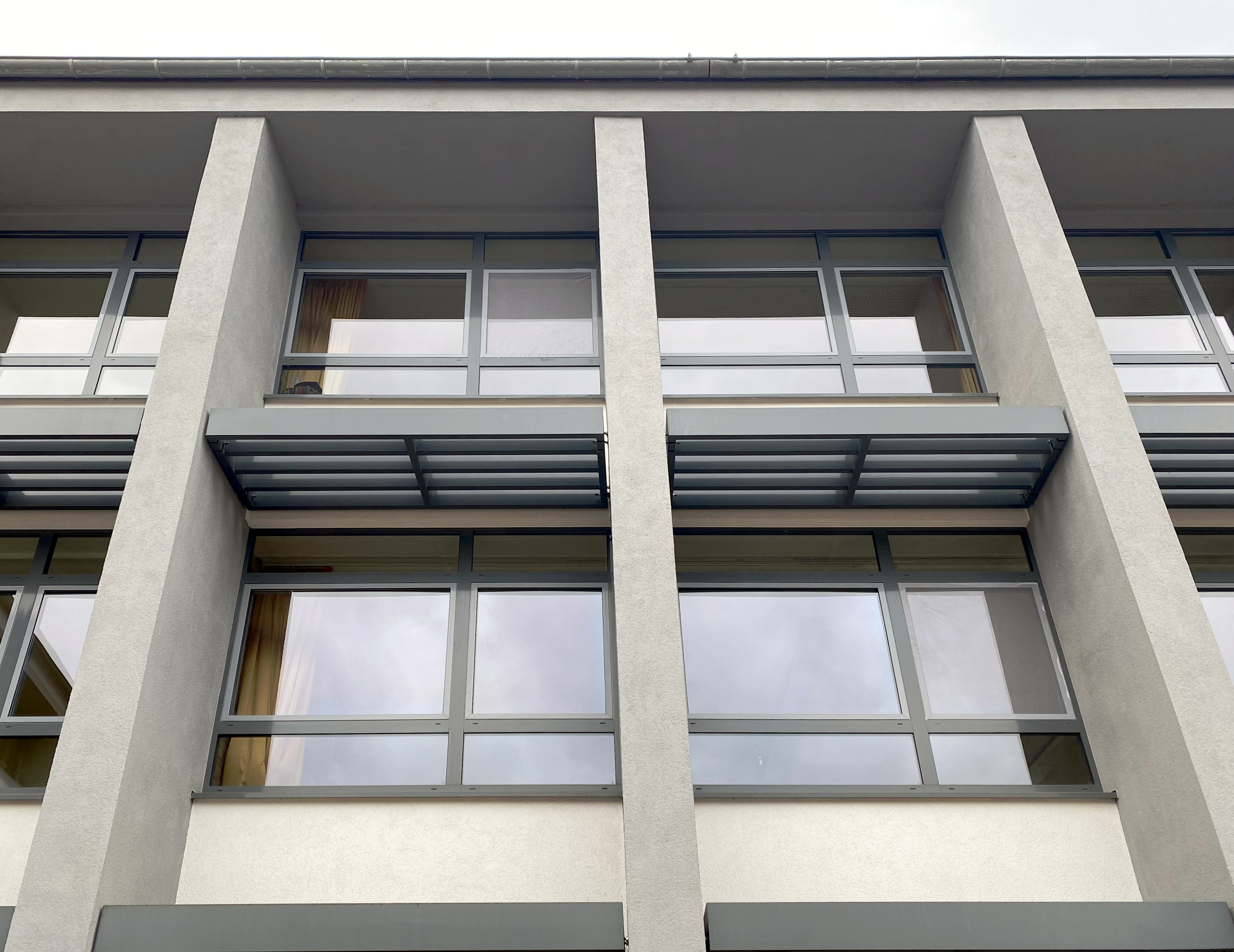
Main columns with lamellas for sun protection (Thomas-Mann-Straße, renovated)

Structurally, the Kreuzbau building is a skeleton building made of precast concrete elements, built on a foundation without a full basement and finished with a flat roof.

After setting up the construction site, the basement and foundation were built using conventional construction methods: A boiler room basement was excavated and removed under one of the four wings. The ceiling above the basement and the rest of the foundation were then constructed in reinforced concrete. All other slabs of the Kreuzbau building were assembled from 16 cm thick precast concrete elements. All these precast concrete elements were brought to the construction site by special trucks, where they were lifted to the assembly site by means of a single mobile crane - a tower crane was not required.

The assembly of the Kreuzbau building was carried out by means of an auxiliary scaffold that extended over two stories. This scaffold was precisely aligned and served as falsework for the preliminary attachment of the reinforced concrete columns and wall sections as well as for the support of the floor slabs. The largest components were the 10.7 m long vertical main columns that run through all three floors. The slabs are designed as T-beams, with two to four main ribs (webs) transferring the load. Connecting steels project inward from the main columns, to which an edge beam of cast-in-place concrete is attached, connecting the main columns to the slabs. Once the inner corner section was installed, the structure had enough stability against torsion and the auxiliary scaffold was removed.

After 15 working days the concrete skeleton was ready and the flat roof could be added. The construction was thus practically independent of the weather, which can be seen from the completion dates, which knew no winter break. After completion of the roof, the installation work and drywall construction took place, while at the same time the end faces of the wings were bricked up with masonry.

== Demolition or redevelopment? ==
Some of the series and prefabricated buildings of the Hamburg Building Authority from the post-war period are now considered to be unsuitable for renovation. This applies in particular to the Type A pavilions, whose wood-frame walls were provided with an outer skin of "fulgurite" and an inner wall of "lignate." "Fulgurite" and "lignate" are brand names for fire-retardant fibre cement. Beginning in 1987, the city of Hamburg had its schools inspected for asbestos and in some cases closed. From 1988, 182 school pavilions in Hamburg were disposed of or demolished because of asbestos contamination. From 1993, the use of asbestos in new buildings was generally prohibited. Kreuzbau buildings are not structurally contaminated with asbestos, so the question of renovation was decided primarily on the basis of economic efficiency and space requirements.

=== Space requirements and building condition ===
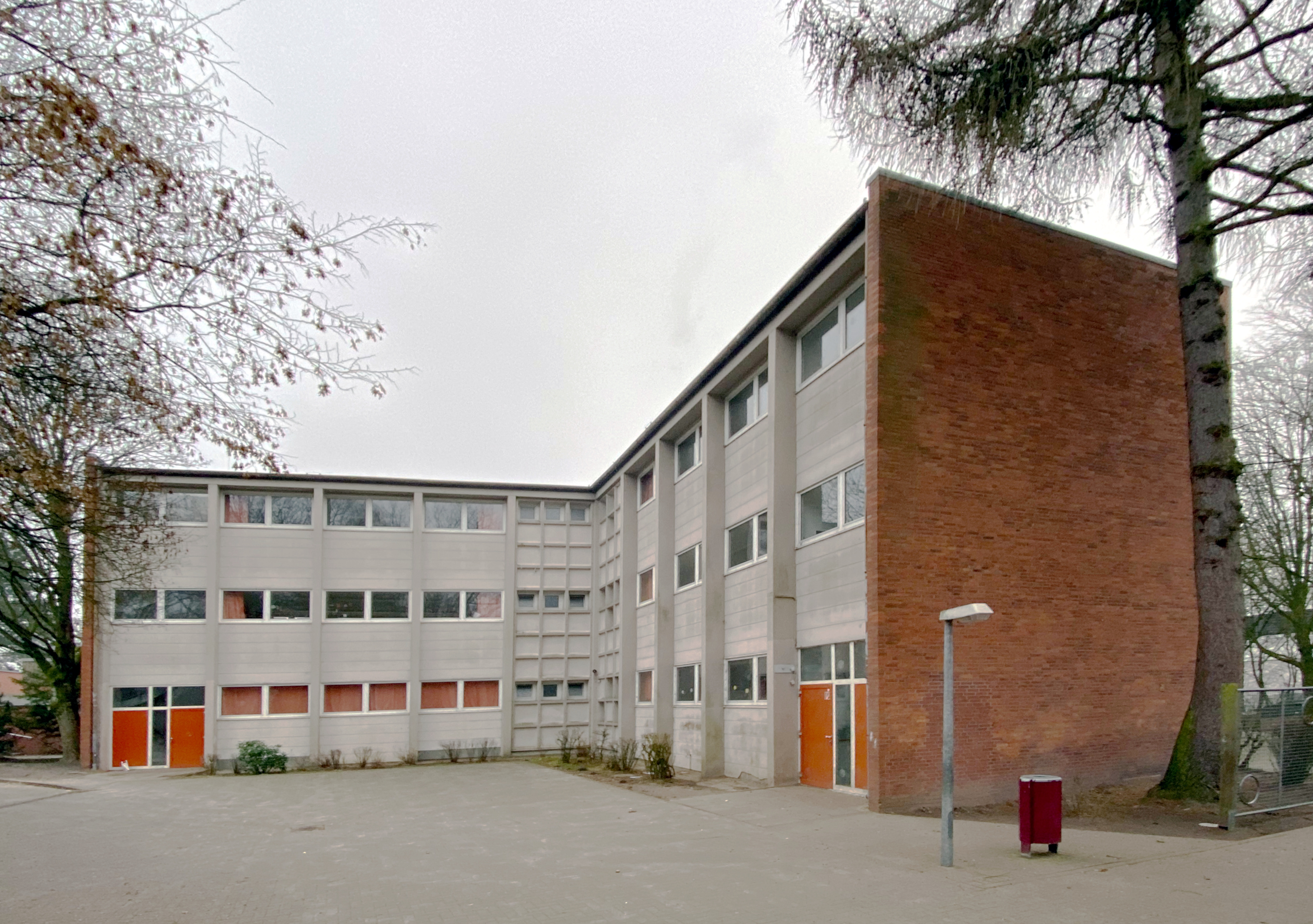
Unrenovated Kreuzbau (Eberhofweg)

From 2010 onwards, the decision on whether to renovate or demolish or replace most of the Kreuzbau buildings became urgent: the Kreuzbau buildings were now around 50 years old and no longer met current requirements, especially in terms of thermal insulation. Also, the accessibility required with increasing inclusion of pupils with walking disabilities is only available on the first floor in existing buildings. Unrenovated Kreuzbau buildings were therefore consistently rated 4 or 5 in the 2019 building classification of the Hamburg authorities (1 = new construction, 2 = basic renovation and meeting all current standards, 6 = practically unusable). A building classification (GKL) of 2 is targeted through renovation. At the same time, the number of pupils in Hamburg has risen sharply since the turn of the millennium. Between 2011 and 2020 alone, the total number of students increased by 11%, and the number of elementary school students even increased by more than 17%. The increase of 11,600 elementary school students from 2011 to 2020 alone is equivalent to more than 500 classrooms at a maximum class frequency of 23 students. By 2030, the number of students is expected to reach about 240,000, a further increase of about 20% over 2020.

In view of this development - the need for renovation on the one hand, and rapidly growing space requirements on the other - the decision had to be made at most locations between renovation or demolition with replacement construction. In most cases, the state operation Schulbau Hamburg (SBH) decided in favor of renovation. On the other hand, when a school site was abandoned altogether or a comprehensive new building concept was implemented, the Kreuzbau buildings were also demolished. Kreuzbau buildings are difficult to integrate into existing or new buildings because of the lack of options for horizontal circulation. If a corridor is to lead from a directly adjacent building into a Kreuzbau building, this can only be done via the end face of a wing, which thus becomes a passageway and is lost as a classroom.

About 80% of the Kreuzbau buildings were still standing in 2020 and were mainly used by elementary schools as classrooms. The majority of the surviving Kreuzbau buildings have been renovated. A few of this type of buildings are under ensemble protection, i.e. are listed. Accessibility for physically handicapped children has so far only been realized in one case - in the Kreuzbau building of the Schule Hinsbleek, an elevator was installed in the stairwell eye. The majority of the Kreuzbau buildings have been renovated.

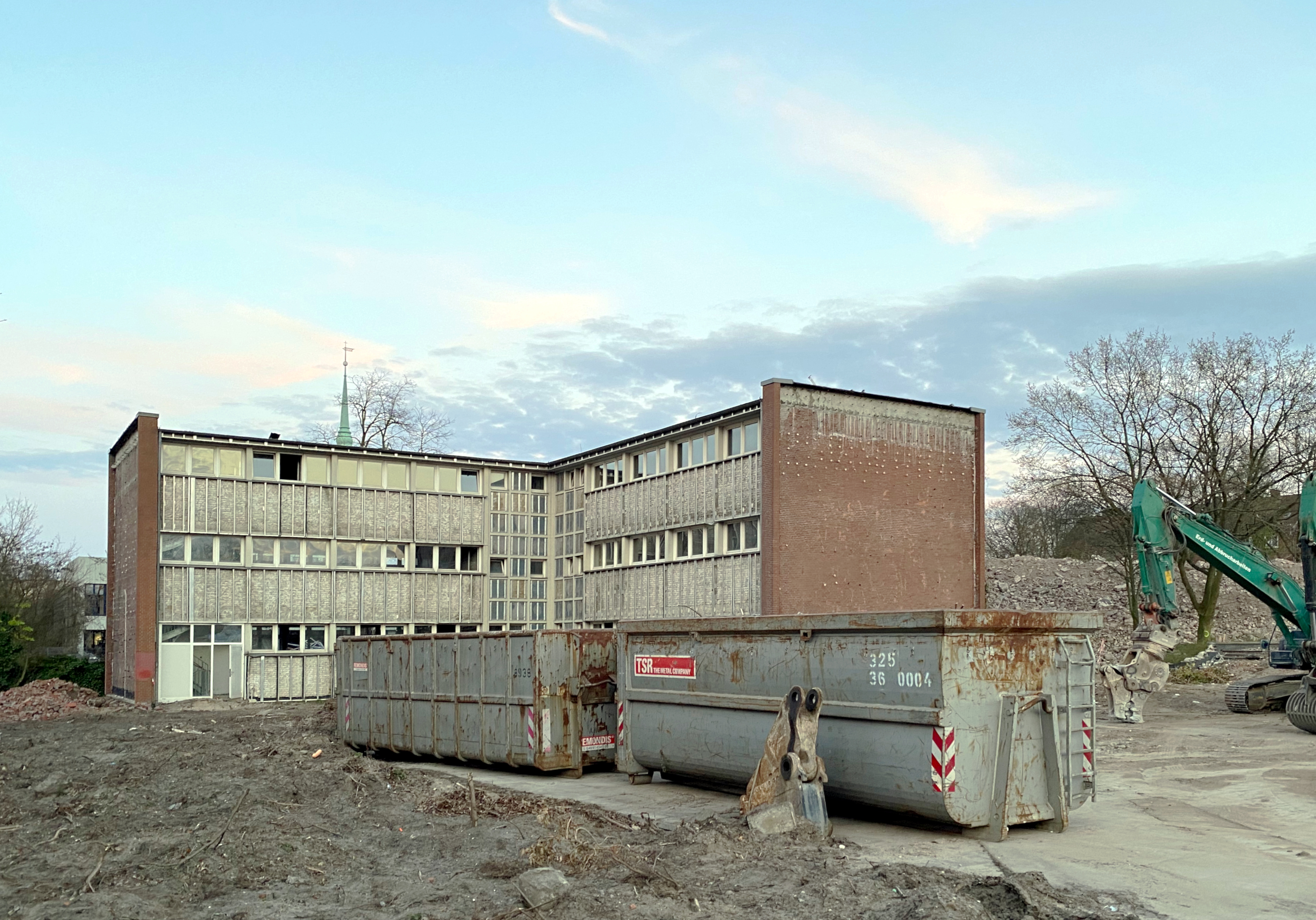
Demolition (Königstraße), facade panels and face insulation removed.

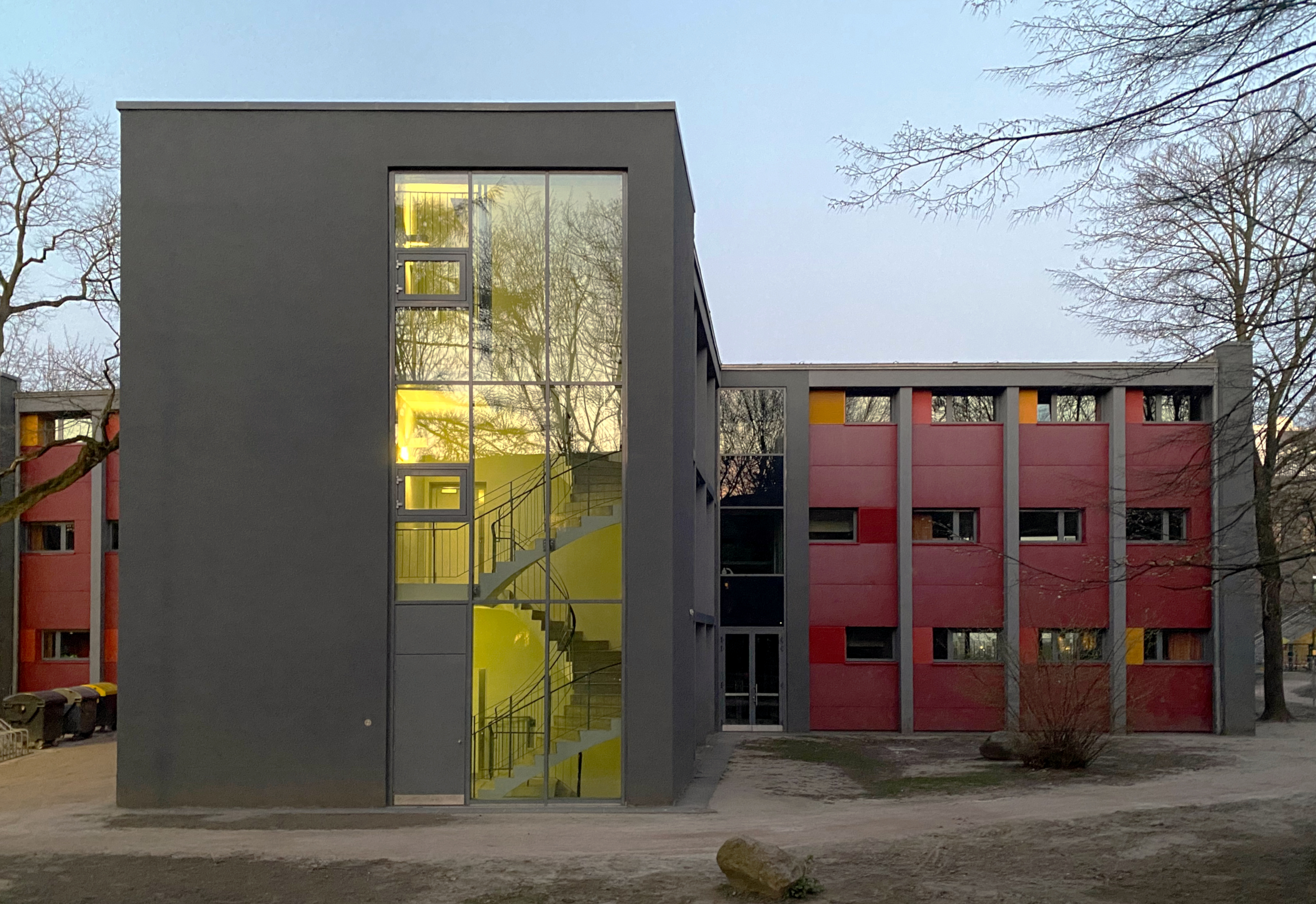
Renovated school with massive thermal insulation (Hohe Landwehr)

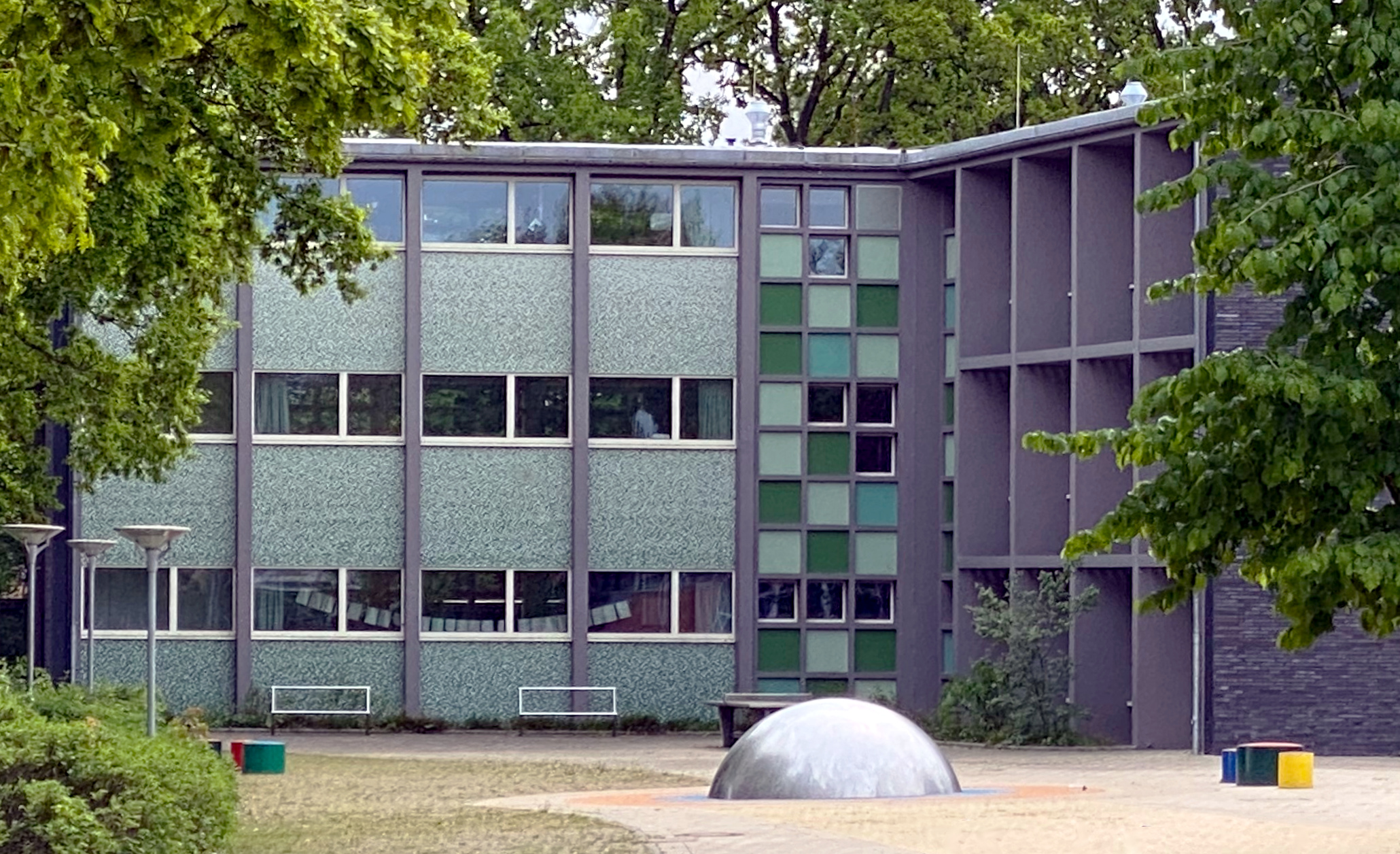
Renovated school in careful design (Schierenberg)

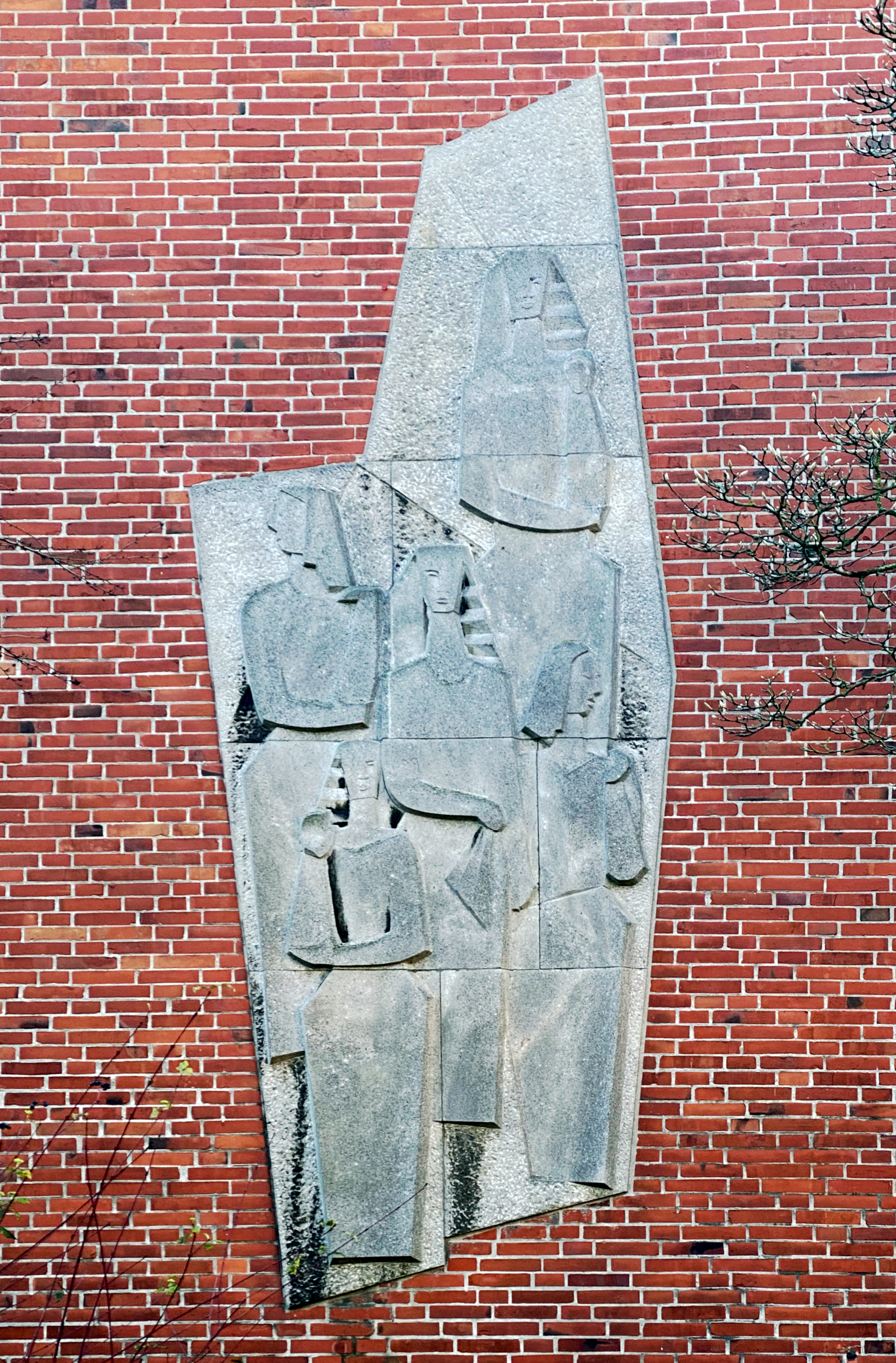
Kunst am Bau (Kurdamm)

=== Thermal insulation ===
Due to the almost always missing monument protection, the Energieeinsparverordnung applied to these renovations without any cutbacks. This led to "large thermal insulation package[s]" and an often "crude renovation." The slender profiles of the windows and the piers were often lost, and in some cases the shadow-giving louvers were also removed. A positive counterexample is the renovation of the Kreuzbau building at Schierenberg, where the reinforced concrete piers were excluded from the insulation. These are only in direct contact with the building structure at the floor slabs and thus contribute little to heat loss. The non-load-bearing walls and the windows, on the other hand, were rebuilt instead of packing the old structure with an insulation layer on wooden battens, as is usually done.

The yellow clinker bricks of the original buildings are lost in any case, as the thermal insulation layer requires a new facing. At Schierenberg, green-white glass mosaics in the parapets and black clinker on the end walls were chosen for this purpose - a quotation from the architecture of the 1960s, but not a reconstruction. On the other hand, strong color contrasts were used in some renovated Kreuzbau buildings (Beltgens Garten, Stengelestraße), but often the aim is to use a color scheme that corresponds to the original materials.

=== Art on building ===
In front of and in some of the Kreuzbau buildings scheduled for demolition, works by renowned artists were installed or mounted. Where these works could be easily dismantled, they were usually moved to other buildings on the school site. Plastic arts in front of Kreuzbau buildings were moved. Murals or frescoes, on the other hand, are permanently attached to the building.

In the Kreuzbau building of the Gymnasium Rahlstedt were three wall paintings by Eduard Bargheer from 1959. The removal of the picture carrier with the listed pictures was calculated at 150,000 euros. In 2019, two of the three paintings were installed in the atrium of the new Gymnasium building, the remaining picture had been damaged during the removal. The wall paintings were removed.

=== Fire protection ===
Despite repeated tightening of the fire protection regulations since 1938, the Kreuzbau buildings also comply with the current status. Hamburg's 2001 fire protection regulations for school buildings require that each classroom on the same floor have two independent escape routes to exits to the outside or to necessary stairs. The length of the escape route to reach the stairs is limited to a maximum of 35 m. Since the classrooms are 9 m long and up to 8 m wide, the furthest corner results in a diagonal of 12 m per classroom, which must be traversed twice in the worst case. This still leaves more than enough escape route length for the escape connecting corridor between the classrooms. The second escape route in the emergency stairwells must be kept clear, and the other requirements for door and aisle widths are met. If this had not been the case, an exterior stairwell would have to be added to at least two of the wings during renovation, with corresponding costs.

The practical suitability of the escape concept has so far been "tested" in one case: At the Schule Eckerkoppel, a fire broke out in the Kreuzbau building while the school was in session. The fire originated on the second floor of the east wing and from there set fire to the floor above and the flat roof structure. All students were evacuated, there was no personal injury. Two classrooms were completely burned out, a third classroom was severely damaged by firewater and soot. The Kreuzbau building was subsequently demolished. As a replacement, after one year of planning and nine months of construction, a modular wooden building of the "Hamburger Klassenhaus" type was erected to accommodate twelve classes on two floors. The new building was occupied in January 2020. Thus, the next phase of serial construction of classrooms in Hamburg has been initiated.

== Classification and evaluation ==
The Kreuzbau building was part of an attempt to greatly accelerate school construction and significantly increase space efficiency compared to the pavilion school, while maintaining the ideal of the "school in the green." These goals were partially achieved, but the "growing school" concept could not keep pace with the need for classrooms. A balance of classroom buildings, community buildings and green spaces was rarely achieved, certainly not with buildings that followed the same stylistic idea. Instead, many school sites in Hamburg feature a mixture of serial buildings of different generations and styles that wrap around the schoolyard like annual rings - starting with lightweight pavilions, then a Kreuzbau building, plus a Seitz gymnasium and administration with a clinker facade, and concluding with honeycomb buildings made of concrete or a string of Type 65 bricks.

From a functional and aesthetic point of view, the Kreuzbau building is a successful design - as an individual building. The "communicative central staircase" and the "quality of the trapezoidal floor plan" of the classrooms, which provide a good framework for other forms of group work in addition to frontal teaching, are praised. Furthermore, the "generous sun protection" is emphasized. Finally, the "formative building shape" creates something like a focal point of the school grounds, especially in comparison to the low box shapes of the other Hamburg series buildings. However, the Kreuzbau building does not stand alone, but is part of an ensemble. In 1961, Egbert Kossak, who later became Hamburg's chief building director, expressed a scathing criticism of Hamburg's "inferior, template-like school construction" in a letter to the editor of an architectural magazine: "With striking but unresisting monotony, the 'famous' Klassenkreuz, pavilions, and gymnasium blocks are scattered over Hamburg. [...] Hamburg [...] boasts of the mass production of proportionless structures that stand out for their questionable modernist design."

The main advantage of type construction was rapid assembly with only a few workers, since in post-war Hamburg there was an immense demand for school replacement buildings and new buildings that the construction industry could not satisfy by conventional means. On the other hand, the goal of cost reduction compared to individual designs or solid buildings was not achieved - this can be seen in a comparison with the designs for special schools, which were also executed by individual architects outside the structural engineering department during the Seitz era. The poor thermal insulation compared to today's standards results from the typical construction method of the time with slim profiles and many thermal bridges. In this respect, the Kreuzbau building is neither better nor worse than other post-war buildings. At least it is not contaminated with asbestos, and in most cases renovation is significantly less expensive than replacement construction. Due to its construction, the Kreuzbau building is difficult to connect to new buildings. Cautiously renovated, it can be an attractive solitaire.

== Locations ==
The following list of Kreuzbau buildings in Hamburg does not claim to be complete. Legend:

- #: Numbering of the Kreuzbau buildings in alphabetical order by name.
- Name: current user of the Kreuzbau building. For elementary schools, the name is shortened to "school"; for district schools, the name is shortened to "STS"
- Address: Street address of school location, linked with coordinates. A map with all coordinates is linked at the top of the article.
- District: District of the location of the Kreuzbau building
- Borough: Borough of the location of the Kreuzbau building
- Year: year of construction of the Kreuzbau building, defined as the year of acceptance.
- Image: link to Commons category on school site: "Yes", there are images of the corresponding Kreuzbau buildings; "-", no images of the Kreuzbau buildings, but information on the school building.
- Notes: Building condition, historic preservation, renovation. "First series" refers to "K1 V1" type Kreuzbau buildings, which have two glazed emergency stairwells.

For demolished Kreuzbau buildings, the corresponding line is grayed out.

Locations of Kreuzbau buildings in Hamburg
#	Name	Address	District	Borough	Year	Picture	Notes
1	Adolph-Schönfelder-Schule	Brucknerstraße 1	Barmbek-Süd	Nord	1960	Yes	2018/19 renovated
2	Vocational school Uferstraße (BS 29)	Uferstraße 9	Barmbek-Süd	Nord	1958	Yes	First series, under monumental protection in 2009
3	Vocational school W 7	Wielandstraße 9	Eilbek	Wandsbek	1957	-	Demolished
4	Erich Kästner Schule	An der Berner Au 12	Farmsen-Berne	Wandsbek	1959	Yes	
5	Fritz-Köhne-Schule	Marckmannstraße 61	Rothenburgsort	Mitte	1959	Yes	
6	Goethe-Schule Harburg	Eißendorfer Straße 26	Harburg	Harburg	1962	Yes	
7	Gymnasium Bondenwald	Bondenwald 14b	Niendorf	Eimsbüttel	1960	Yes	
8	Gymnasium Corveystraße	Corveystraße 6	Lokstedt	Eimsbüttel	1963	Yes	2017/19 renovated
9	Gymnasium Meiendorf	Schierenberg 50	Rahlstedt	Wandsbek	1960	Yes	2013/14 renovated
10	Gymnasium Othmarschen	Walderseestraße 99	Othmarschen	Altona	1960	Yes	Originally to the school Klein Flottbeker Weg
11	Gymnasium Rahlstedt	Scharbeutzer Straße 36	Rahlstedt	Wandsbek	1959		Demolished
12	HAW, former engineering school	Stiftstraße 69	St. Georg	Mitte	1959	Yes	Only Klassenkreuz not erected for the school board
13	IfBQ, former school Beltgens Garten	Beltgens Garten 25	Hamm	Mitte	1959	Yes	Rebuilt, renovated in 2016
14	Max-Schmeling-STS	Oktaviostraße 143	Marienthal	Wandsbek	1958	Yes	First series
15	Max-Traeger-Schule	Baumacker 10	Eidelstedt	Eimsbüttel	1963	Yes	
16	Rudolf-Roß-Schule	Kurze Straße 30	Neustadt	Mitte	1961	Yes	
17	Schule Alsterredder	Alsterredder 28	Sasel	Wandsbek	1959	Yes	Front sides energetically renovated
18	Schule am Eichtalpark	Walddörferstraße 243	Wandsbek	Wandsbek	1962	Yes	2013 interior renovated
19	Schule An der Seebek	Fabriciusstraße 150	Bramfeld	Wandsbek	1958	Yes	First series
20	Schule An der Seebek	Heinrich-Helbing-Straße 50	Bramfeld	Wandsbek	1959	Yes	2014–2015 renovated
21	Schule Bandwirkerstraße	Bandwirkerstraße 56	Wandsbek	Wandsbek	1959	Yes	1997/98 renovated
22	Schule at St. Catherine's Church	Katharinenkirchhof (Grimm 1, 7)	Hamburg-Altstadt	Mitte	1957		Prototype, was listed, demolished
23	Schule Bekassinenau	Bekassinenau 32	Rahlstedt	Wandsbek	1959	Yes	
24	Schule Eberhofweg	Eberhofweg 63	Langenhorn	Nord	1960	Yes	
25	Schule Eckerkoppel	Berner Heerweg 99	Farmsen-Berne	Wandsbek	1960		2018 burned out, then demolished
26	Schule Fahrenkrön	Fahrenkrön 115	Bramfeld	Wandsbek	1960	Yes	
27	Schule Fährstraße	Fährstraße 90	Wilhelmsburg	Mitte	1962	Yes	2016/17 renovated
28	Schule Grellkamp	Grellkamp 40	Langenhorn	Nord	1957	Yes	First series, school closed, unoccupied
29	Schule Großlohering	Großlohering 11	Rahlstedt	Wandsbek	1962	Yes	2013-2015 renovated
30	Schule Hanhoopsfeld	Hanhoopsfeld 21	Wilstorf	Harburg	1958		First series, 2016 demolished, now new building Lessing-STS.
31	Schule Hinsbleek	Hinsbleek 14	Poppenbüttel	Wandsbek	1961	Yes	2012/13 renovated, lift installation
32	Schule Hohe Landwehr	Hohe Landwehr 19	Hamm	Mitte	1958	Yes	First series, 2010 renovated
33	Schule Horn	Rhiemsweg 61	Horn	Mitte	1958	Yes	First series
34	Schule Humboldtstraße	Humboldtstraße 30	Barmbek-Süd	Nord	1960	Yes	
35	Schule Ifflandstraße	Ifflandstraße 30	Hohenfelde	Nord	1960		2012 demolished
36	Schule Karlshöhe	Thomas-Mann-Straße 2	Bramfeld	Wandsbek	1961	Yes	Renovated after 2009
37	Schule Königstraße	Struenseestraße 20	Altona-Altstadt	Altona	1960	Yes	2019-2020 demolished
38	Schule Königstraße	Struenseestraße 20	Altona-Altstadt	Altona	1960	Yes	2019-2020 demolished
39	Schule Krohnstieg	Krohnstieg 107	Langenhorn	Nord	1963	Yes	
40	Schule Langbargheide	Langbargheide 40	Lurup	Altona	1958	Yes	First series
41	Schule Marienthal	Schimmelmannstraße 70	Marienthal	Wandsbek	1961	Yes	
42	Schule Mendelstraße	Mendelstraße 6	Lohbrügge	Bergedorf	1963	Yes	Renovation planned from 2020
43	Schule Neubergerweg	Neubergerweg 2	Langenhorn	Nord	1960	Yes	
44	Schule Neugraben	Francoper Straße 32	Neugraben-Fischbek	Harburg	1961	Yes	To be demolished
45	Schule Ohkamp	Ohkampring 13	Fuhslbüttel	Nord	1958	Yes	First series
46	Schule Potsdamer Straße	Potsdamer Straße 6	Rahlstedt	Wandsbek	1962	Yes	
47	Schule Richardstraße	Richardstraße 85	Eilbek	Wandsbek	1960		2018 demolished
48	Schule Rungwisch	Rungwisch 23	Eidelstedt	Eimsbüttel	1962	Yes	
49	Schule Sander Straße	Sander Straße 11	Bergedorf	Bergedorf	1962	Yes	Renovation planned until 2022
50	Schule Schenefelder Landstraße	Schenefelder Landstraße 206	Iserbrook	Altona	1963	Yes	2011-2012 rebuilt
51	Schule Stengelestraße	Stengelestraße 38	Horn	Mitte	1958	Yes	First series, 2008-2012 renovated
52	Schule Stephanstraße	Stephanstraße 15	Wandsbek	Wandsbek	1963		Demolished
53	Schule Stockflethweg	Stockflethweg 160	Langenhorn	Nord	1961	Yes	
54	Schule Surenland	Bramfelder Weg 121	Farmsen-Berne	Wandsbek	1957	Yes	First series, 2011 renovated
55	Schule Tonndorf	Rahlaukamp 1	Tonndorf	Wandsbek	1961	Yes	2020 renovated
56	Schule Turmweg	Turmweg 33	Rotherbaum	Eimsbüttel	1962	Yes	
57	Schule Wesperloh	Wesperloh 19	Osdorf	Altona	1961	Yes	listed, 2016 renovated
58	Schule Wielandstraße	Wielandstraße 9	Eilbek	Wandsbek	1957		2012/13 demolished
59	Schule Windmühlenweg	Windmühlenweg 17	Groß Flottbek	Altona	1961	Yes	
60	Sprachheilschule Wilhelmsburg	Kurdamm 8	Wilhelmsburg	Mitte	1960	Yes	Two-story, unoccupied
61	Sprachheilschule Wilhelmsburg	Kurdamm 8	Wilhelmsburg	Mitte	1960	Yes	Two-story, unoccupied
62	STS Helmuth Hübener	Benzenbergweg 2	Barmbek-Nord	Nord	1959	Yes	2007 Production of fire safety
63	STS Horn	Horner Weg 89	Horn	Mitte	1961	Yes	2015 renovated
64	STS Lurup	Vermoor 4	Lurup	Altona	1962	Yes	2017/18 renovated
65	STS Öjendorf	Öjendorfer Höhe 12	Billstedt	Mitte	1958	Yes	First series
66	STS Wilhelmsburg	Perlstieg 1	Wilhelmsburg	Mitte	1958	Yes	First series, 2016 to 2019 renovated
67	Westerschule Finkenwerder	Finkenwerder Landscheideweg 180	Finkenwerder	Mitte	1962	Yes	

== Bibliography ==
- Boris Meyn: Der Architekt und Städteplaner Paul Seitz. Eine Werkmonographie. Verein für Hamburgische Geschichte, Hamburg 1996, ISBN 3-923356-73-0
- Boris Meyn: Die Entwicklungsgeschichte des Hamburger Schulbaus (= Schriften zur Kulturwissenschaft. Band 18). Kovač, Hamburg 1998, ISBN 3-86064-707-5
- Olaf Bartels: Kreuzbau am Schierenberg. In: Bauwelt, Nr. 47.2015, pp. 30–33.
- Das Hamburger Klassenkreuz. In: Das Werk : Schweizer Monatsschrift für Architektur, Kunst und künstlerisches Gewerbe, ZDB-ID 2529081-2, Band 50 (1963), Heft 6 ("Schulbau"), pp. 234–236, doi:10.5169/seals-87079
- Paul Seitz, Wilhelm Dressel (Hrsg.): Schulbau in Hamburg 1961. Verlag der Werkberichte, Hamburg 1961.
- Baubehörde der Freien und Hansestadt Hamburg (Hrsg.): Hamburger Schulen in Montagebau. Hamburg 1962, PPN 32144938X.
