= Aligned =

- Theatrical Poster
- Directed by: Apollo Bakopoulos
- Written by: Apollo Bakopoulos
- Produced by: Apollo Bakopoulos
- Starring: Panos Malakos; Mantalena Papadatou; Dimitris Fritzelas; Nick Atkinson; Theo Panas; Anna Magou
- Cinematography: Dan Kneece; Stelios Pissas
- Edited by: Apollo Bakopoulos; Nikolaos Raptis
- Music by: Ethan Reece; Thodoris Nikolaou
- Release date: 2023
- Running time: 77 minutes
- Countries: United States; Greece
- Language: Modern Greek

Aligned is a 2023 drama film written and directed by Apollo Bakopoulos. The film had its world premiere at the Brooklyn Film Festival in 2023 and, in the UK, at the BFI Flare: London LGBTIQ+ Film Festival in 2024. The story centers around the life of two male dancers, who develop both artistic and romantic connection as they train with a dance company in Hellas.

Aligned won the Outstanding Achievement award for producing at the Brooklyn Film Festival.

== Cast ==
- Panos Malakos as Aeneas
- Mantalena Papadatou as Dianne
- Dimitris Fritzelas as Alex
- Nick Atkinson as Instructor
- Theo Panas as Self
- Anna Magou as Helen
