= Binocular occlusion =

A zone of binocular occlusion refers to a zone of the visual field that is not visible to either eye; in particular it may refer to:

- in ophthalmology, the use of eye patches over both eyes,
- in ophthalmology and vision therapy, binasal occlusion in which a very large sector is occluded.
