= Outline of dentistry and oral health =

Branch of medicine focused on teeth, gums, and mouth

The following outline is provided as an overview of and topical guide to dentistry and oral health:

Dentistry – branch of medicine that is involved in the study, diagnosis, prevention, and treatment of diseases, disorders and conditions of the oral cavity, maxillofacial area and the adjacent and associated structures and their impact on the human body.

== Branches of dentistry ==
- Endodontics
- Orthodontics
- Minimal intervention dentistry
- Prosthodontics
- Pediatric dentistry
- Periodontics
- Oral and maxillofacial surgery
- Oral pathology
- Oral medicine

== History of dentistry ==
- History of dental caries

== General dentistry concepts ==
- Barodontalgia
- Biodontics
- Bruxism
- Calculus
- Ceramics
- Crown
- Dental amalgam
- Dental brace
- Dental cavities
- Dental disease
- Dental extraction
- Dental notation
- Dental phobia
- Dental restoration
- Dental spa
- Dentin
- Floss
- Fluoridation
- Fluoride therapy
- Gingivitis
- Halitosis
- Dental implants
- Laboratory technology
- Mouth breathing
- Mouthwash
- Nitrous oxide
- Novocain, a Local anesthetic
- Occlusion
- Oral hygiene
- Orthodontics
- Regenerative endodontics
- Patron Saint of dentistry (Saint Apollonia)
- Periodontitis
- Plaque
- Socket preservation
- Regenerative dentistry
- Teledentistry
- Temporomandibular joint disease
- Tooth
- Toothbrush
- Toothpaste
- Tooth regeneration
- Tongue cleaner
- Xerostomia

== Dentistry lists ==
- List of dentists
