= Dental spa =

Dental facility

A dental spa is a dental facility supervised by a licensed oral health care provider in which dental services are provided alongside spa treatments.

"Spa dentistry" refers to dental practices that offer many services not normally associated with dental care: facials, paraffin wax hand treatment, reflexology, micro-dermabrasion, massage therapy, Botox and Restylane treatment, and many other treatments. The administration of Botox and Restylane is based on each respective state's dental board approval.

== Etymology ==
The American Dental Association notes that the consumer media have coined the term "dental spa", but many practices offer services and amenities specifically designed to relax patients without considering themselves a "spa". The loose definition of "dental spas" makes it difficult to know how many dental spas exist in the United States.

In 2003, Lynn Watanabe, DDS of the Dental Spa in Pacific Palisades, California, and the Day Spa Association defined a dental spa as "a facility whose dental program is run under the strict supervision of a licensed Oral Health Care Provider, which might be a Dentist or an Independent Dental Hygienist. Services are provided that integrate both traditional and non-traditional dental and spa treatments such as massage therapy, skincare and body treatments".

== History ==
Ancient civilizations such as the Greeks and Chinese all used certain methods to relax a person suffering from ailments such as a toothache. The "barber surgeon" in the 18th and 19th century allowed barbers to perform some dental procedures as well as shaves and haircuts. The term "spa dentistry" (synonymous to dental spa) was used during the 18th century to describe dental practitioners in Bath, England. Ms. Curris, a female dentist in 18th century Bath likely created the first dental spa, offering patients dentistry with skin and body care.

The terms "dental spa" and "spa dentistry" began to be more publicly used in the late 1990s. In 1998, Lorin Berland DDS reserved the name DallasDentalSpa.com.

=== Timeline ===
==== 1990s ====
1994: London's The Guardian has identified the Atlanta Center for Cosmetic Dentistry as "one of the first of these new dental spas." The February 19, 2007 edition reported that Debra Gray King, DDS, began providing spa services at the Atlanta Center for Cosmetic Dentistry in 1994.

1996: Lorin Berland DDS began providing a massage therapist on staff.

1999: On July 11, 1999, The New York Times reported several Long Island dentists were offering "distraction techniques" by offering massage therapy to their patients. The article reports that massage services were offered since early 1999.

==== 2000s ====
2001: On October 1, 2002, Salt Lake Magazine reported that the Dental Spa in Sugar House provided patients with complimentary spa services such as temple massage, hand treatments, eye masks, and other techniques aimed at calming the patients. The spa services were provided since the Spa's inception in 2001.

2002: On August 12, 2002, the Los Angeles Times reported Lynn Watanabe, DDS, one of the field's "pioneers," opened "Dental Spa" in Pacific Palisades, California, with a full-time esthetician and full-time massage therapist.

== Prevalence ==
In 2003, the American Dental Association reported that more than 50% of 427 practicing dentists surveyed at their annual session offered some sort of spa or office amenity. In 2005, as many as 5% of the American Dental Association's more than 152,000 members had declared themselves "dental spas". In 2007, the ADA estimated that possibly that one in every 20 dental offices in the United States actually offers, to some extent, some spa dentistry services to their patients.

== Professional associations ==
In 1978, the Holistic Dental Association was formed to focus on the mind-body connection and the dental patient's well-being. Spa dentistry is recognized by the International Medical Spa Association and the Day Spa Association, but similar to the field of cosmetic dentistry, it is not recognized as a specialty practice area by the American Dental Association. In 2002, Lynn Watanabe, DDS, founded the first dental spa association with the creation of the International Dental Spa Association. The New York Times reported in 2006 that "it now has ten members and is coming up with guidelines for what services constitute a dental spa."

== Dental fear studies ==
One of the main reasons people avoid visiting the dentist is dental anxiety. Dental anxiety drives some people to create more dental problems by not visiting the dentist on a regular basis. Patients who are high in dental anxiety have the greatest likelihood of avoiding dental treatment. Dental anxiety, or dental fear, is estimated to affect approximately 36% of the population, with a further 12% suffering from extreme dental fear.

The first known scientific study on dental fear occurred in 1954. Dental anxiety has been a well-studied phenomenon since the late 1960s. Since then, studies and several books report successful treatment of patients with dental fear using behavioral methods.

== Variations ==
Variations of the dental spa concept typically combine cosmetic, general, and restorative dentistry with amenities designed to create a comfortable and relaxing experience for patients.
