= Alternating occlusion training =

Alternating occlusion training, also referred to as electronic rapid alternate occlusion, is an approach to amblyopia and to intermittent central suppression in vision therapy, in which electronic devices such as programmable shutter glasses or goggles are used to block the field of view of one eye in rapid alternation.

When performing alternating occlusion training, the person wears the occlusion goggles continuously for several hours while performing regular everyday activities. Wearing the device encourages or forces the alternating use of both eyes, similar to eye patching, but rapidly alternating in time. The aim is to circumvent the tendency to suppress the field of view of the weaker eye and to train the capacity for binocular vision.

Traditionally, eye patches are used to block the field of view of one eye. Strabismic or amblyopic children are often required to wear an eye patch for hours or days. The use of the patch generally alternates on a daily or weekly basis between the two eyes, with a long time duration for the patching of the stronger eye and a shorter time duration, if any, for the patching of the weaker eye. In contrast to eye patching, training with occlusion goggles allows to use rapid rates of alternation.

== Flicker rates ==
Therapeutic procedures have been proposed in which the active eye is switched after a duration of many seconds (for example, with an ON (occlusion) duration of 40 seconds and an OFF state (open) duration of 20 seconds of each minute); others propose a much faster flicker rate of approximately 5 Hz.

An alternating occlusion device (the so-called Translid Binocular Interaction Trainer (TBIS) operating at a rate of 9 to 11 Hz) was introduced by Merrill Allen in 1967 to favor parallel processing of the eyes.

The flicker rate is crucial with relation to potential side effects and may possibly be relevant for the efficacy of the training. It has been suggested that the flickering sequence could be adapted to suit the depth of amblyopia, the required duration of treatment, the age of the patient, or could be adapted dynamically according to the visual function behavior of the amblyopic eye.

== Side-effects and potential risks ==
Reported results of the use of alternating occlusion devices include improved vision, as well as occasional side effects of headaches or discomfort. The purchase of such an electronic LCD may require written permission by the patient's optometrist.

It was found that the flicker rates of 9 to 11 Hz that were employed in the TBIS device are slow enough and the stimulus weak enough to avoid any risk of epileptic seizure. In principle alternating occlusion may interfere with normal visual input. Strictly speaking, alternating occlusion is a form of visual deprivation and as such may have negative effects during a critical period of development. Experiments on kittens that were published 1965 by Hubel and Wiesel showed that continuously submitting kittens at a young age to a protocol under which the eyes were alternatingly occluded on a day-by-day basis over a prolonged period of time led to changes in the visual cortex, in particular a disruption in cellular connections that would normally enable binocular vision. Experiments with rearing young kittens under rapidly alternating monocular occlusion using constantly-worn electronic goggles showed that cortical binocularity was reduced if the flicker rate was 2 Hz or lower, and that binocularity developed normally if it was 2.5 or 3 or 5 Hz.
