= Scholz eye patch =

Political symbol

Viral first public photo of Olaf Scholz with his eye patch

In September 2023, then German Chancellor Olaf Scholz wore a medical eye patch following a jogging accident. A photograph of the Chancellor wearing the eye patch, which he published himself, quickly developed into an Internet meme.

In retrospect, observers have described the deliberate handling of the incident as a successful example of targeted political communication and personal branding in the contemporary digital environment of mass media. The eye patch reportedly became a recognizable feature of the Chancellor, made him appear more relatable, and supported his reputation in the long term.

== Background ==
During a routine jog through Potsdam on 2 September 2023, then German Chancellor Olaf Scholz (SPD) stumbled, sustaining facial injuries in the fall. As a result, he wore a black eye patch over his right eye for several days to support healing and cover the injured eyelid.

On 4 September 2023, Scholz published a photograph of himself wearing the eye patch on the social media platform X (then Twitter) via the official account for the German Chancellor, accompanied by the self-ironic caption: "Whoever has the damage... Excited to see the memes. Thanks for the get-well wishes, looks worse than it is". According to then spokesperson of the government Steffen Hebestreit, the image was posted with the intent of accustoming the public to the Chancellor's temporarily altered appearance.

On social media, the image was quickly met with both recovery wishes and jokes at Scholz's expense. The image of the Chancellor wearing an eye patch was taken up in the form of memes, which placed the image in pop-cultural (for example referencing fictional pirates) or political contexts ("a blind right-side eye", Pirate Party). International media also covered the incident extensively, usually focusing on the Chancellor's physical appearance and the subsequent reactions.

== Analysis ==
Some political scientists and media commentators interpreted Scholz's proactive approach to handling the injury (particularly the early publication of the photograph with caption) as a strategic use of humor and self-irony to shape public perception and pre-empt ridicule. As a discourse-shaping visual, effectively instrumentalizing a public official's past mistakes, Scholz's open handling of the eye patch was seen as bearing similarities to Donald Trump's handling of the Trump mug shot.

Observers suggested that Scholz's markedly calm way of dealing with the injury (evident, for example, in him maintaining the same gesture and facial expressions despite the eye patch) was intended to signal reliability. In addition, it was speculated that the eye patch may have been chosen as a symbol of determination and strength in leadership in order to counteract a widespread public perception of the Chancellor as overly formalistic. At the same time, the open display of personal vulnerability was said to make him appear more relatable, thereby increasing his popularity. Some commentators classified the accessory as a kind of "political trademark", noting previous political leaders wearing similarly distinctive eye patches.

Body language experts noted that, rather than irritating or diminishing his authority, choosing to wear an eye patch may have enabled Scholz to influence the framing of his injury in media discourse (see spin). Overall, the case was cited as illustrating the interplay between the growing personalization of European politics (referring to an increasing focus on individual political leaders) and social media use in politics. In this context, the media attention awarded to the Scholz eye patch was also criticized as an expression of a general shift away from substantive political content towards politainment.

== Aftermath ==
On 12 September 2023, the Chancellor made his first public appearance without the eye patch since sustaining the injury. Apart from minor scarring, he had suffered no lasting health damage. In later interviews, he would state that he was glad to not have to wear his "trademark" any longer, but remarked: "... it touched me how many people reached out to me in kindness."

A written parliamentary inquiry by Member of the Bundestag Fabian Jacobi (AfD), asking which campaign advertising agency had been commissioned to come up with the viral post, yielded the answer of "None".

In an interview with local newspaper Heilbronner Stimme, Olaf Scholz agreed to the suggestion of auctioning his eye patch for the charity fundraising campaign Menschen in Not. Although the original had already been disposed of for hygienic reasons, the Chancellor still possessed unused replacement eye patches, one of which he signed and donated to the auction. It ended up being sold for €5,100.

Later high-profile public appearances by politicians wearing eye protection, for example French President Emmanuel Macron wearing sunglasses due to an eye infection at the 56th World Economic Forum in 2026, were compared by commentators to the Scholz eye patch in terms of style and impact.

== See also ==
- Merkel-Raute – Characteristic element of the public appearance of Olaf Scholz's predecessor Angela Merkel
- Mao suit – Similarly distinctive garment and trademark of Mao Zedong
