= Dental Hypotheses =

- Discipline: Dentistry
- Language: English
- Edited by: Edward F. Rossomando

Publication details
- History: 2010-present
- Publisher: Medknow Publications
- Frequency: Quarterly
- Open access: Yes
- License: Creative Commons Attribution-NonCommercial-ShareAlike 4.0 License

Standard abbreviations
- ISO 4: Dent. Hypotheses

Indexing
- CODEN: DHEYA6
- ISSN: 2155-8213 (print); 2319-2038 (web)
- OCLC no.: 929039159

Links
- Journal homepage; Online access; Online archive

Dental Hypotheses is a quarterly peer-reviewed open access medical journal covering all aspects of dentistry. It was established in 2010 by Jafar Kolahi and Edward F. Rossomando. The journal is published by Medknow Publications and the editor-in-chief is Edward F. Rossomando (University of Connecticut). It is an official journal of the American Biodontics Society and the Center for Research and Education in Technology. The latest SJR report shows that the level of the journal has been increased significantly to Q4 (2020). Dental Hypotheses is a member of Committee on Publication Ethics (COPE).

== Abstracting and indexing ==
The journal is abstract ed and indexed in Chemical Abstracts Service, EBSCO databases, Emerging Sources Citation Index (Journal Citation Indicator=0.47), UGC, ProQuest databases, and Scopus.

Impact Factor^{®} as reported in the 2025 Journal Citation Reports^{®} (Clarivate Analytics, 2026) is 1.6.

== See also ==
- Biodontics
- Medical Hypotheses
