= Eyepatch =

Small patch that is worn in front of an eye

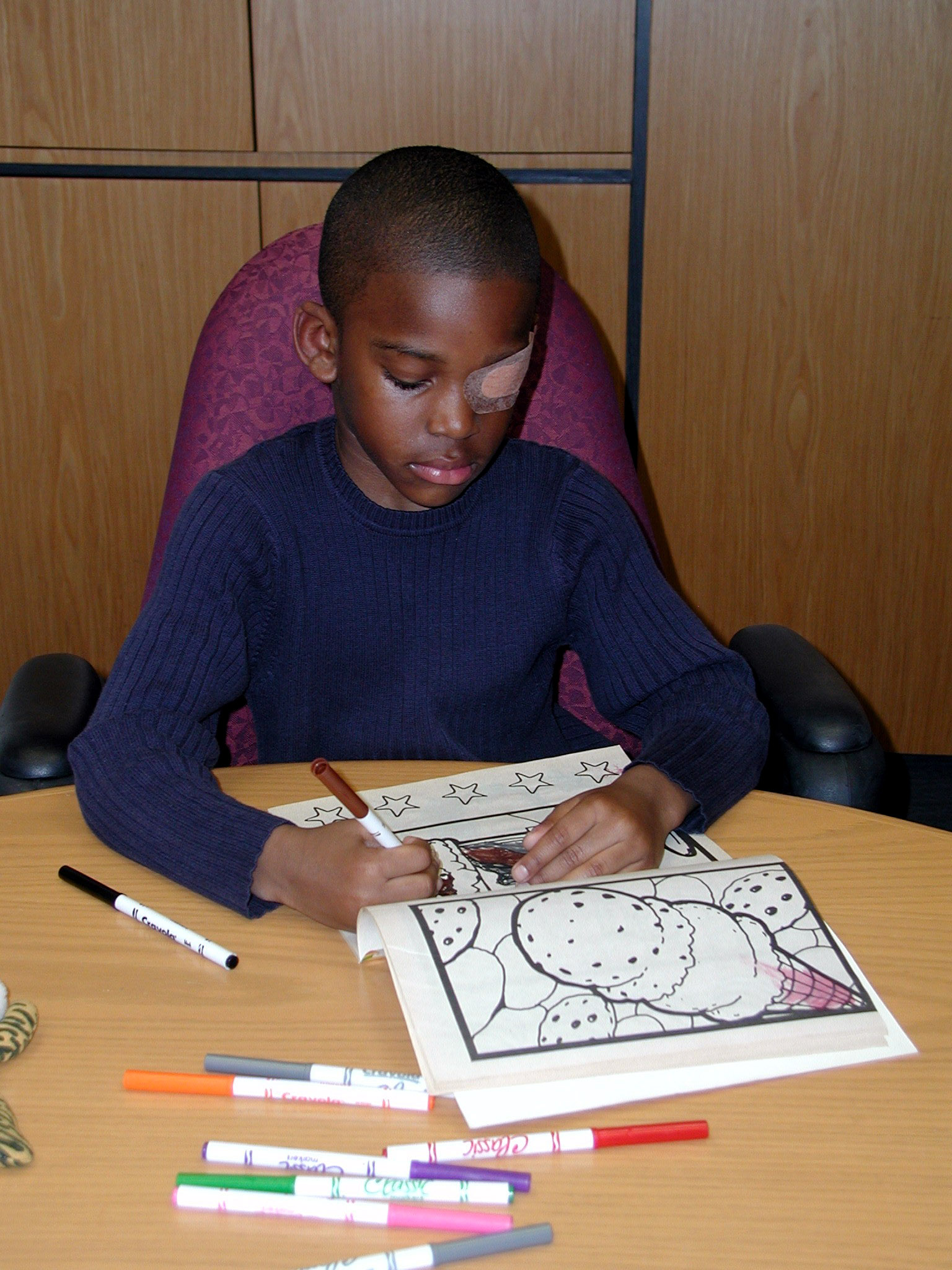
- A child wearing an adhesive eyepatch to correct amblyopia

An eyepatch is a small patch that is worn in front of one eye. It may be a cloth patch attached around the head by an elastic band or by a string, an adhesive bandage, or a plastic device which is clipped to a pair of glasses. It is often worn by people to cover a lost, infected, or injured eye, but it also has a therapeutic use in children for the treatment of amblyopia. Eyepatches used to block light while sleeping are referred to as a sleep mask.

An eyepad or eye pad is a soft medical dressing that can be applied over an eye to protect it. It is not necessarily the same as an eyepatch.

== History ==
In the years before advanced medicine and surgery, eyepatches were common for people who had a lost or injured eye. They were particularly prevalent among members of dangerous occupations, such as soldiers and sailors who could lose an eye in battle. While stereotypically associated with pirates, there is no evidence to suggest the historical accuracy of eye patch wearing pirates before several popular novels of the 19th century (see Association with pirates below).

== Medical uses ==
=== Amblyopia ===
Eye patching is used in the orthoptic management of children at risk of lazy eye (amblyopia), especially strabismic or anisometropic amblyopia. These conditions can cause visual suppression of areas of the dissimilar images by the brain such as to avoid diplopia, resulting in a loss of visual acuity in the suppressed eye and in extreme cases in blindness in an otherwise functional eye. Patching the good eye forces the amblyopic eye to function, thereby causing vision in that eye to be retained. It is important to perform "near activities" (such as reading or handiwork) when patched, thereby exercising active, attentive vision.

A study provided evidence that children treated for amblyopia with eye patching had lower self-perception of social acceptance. To prevent a child from being socially marginalized by their peers due to wearing an eye patch, atropine eye drops may be used instead. This induces temporary blurring in the treated eye.

It has been pointed out that the penalization of one eye by means of patching or atropine drops does not provide the necessary conditions to develop or improve binocular vision. Efforts have been made to propose alternative treatments of amblyopia that do allow for the improvement of binocular sight, for example, using binasal occlusion or partially frosted spectacles in place of any eye patch, using alternating occlusion goggles or using methods of perceptual learning based on video games or virtual reality games for enhancing binocular vision.

A 2014 Cochrane Review sought to determine the effectiveness of occlusion treatment on patients with sensory deprivation amblyopia, however no trials were found eligible to be included in the review. However, it is suggested that good outcomes from occlusion treatment for sensory deprivation amblyopia rely on compliance with the treatment.

=== Extraocular muscle palsy ===
To initially relieve double vision (diplopia) caused by an extra-ocular muscle palsy, an eye care professional may recommend using an eyepatch. This can help to relieve the dizziness, vertigo and nausea that are associated with this form of double vision.

== Use by aircraft pilots ==
Aircraft pilots used an eye patch, or close one eye to preserve night vision when there was disparity in the light intensity within or outside their aircraft, such as when flying at night over brightly lit cities, so that one eye could look out, and the other would be adjusted for the dim lighting of the cockpit to read unlit instruments and maps. Some military pilots have worn a lead-lined or gold-lined eyepatch, to protect against blindness in both eyes, in the event of a nuclear blast or laser weapon attack.

Eyepatches are not currently used by military personnel; modern technology has provided an array of other means to preserve and enhance night vision, including red-light and low-level white lights, and night vision devices.

== Association with pirates ==
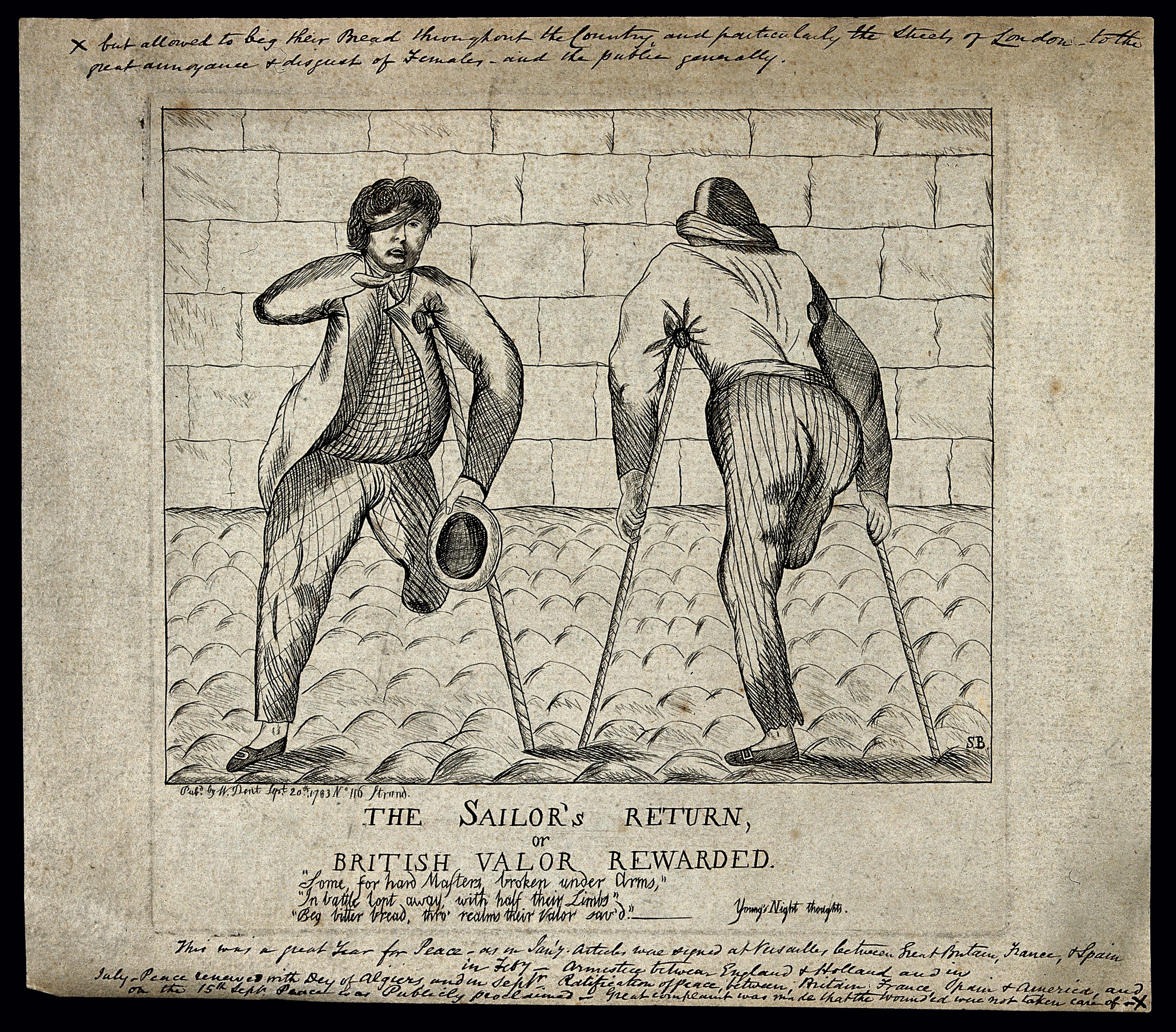
1783 etching of wounded sailors

Ex-sailors ashore sometimes wore an eye patch to cover the loss of an eye, but pirates rarely wore eye patches while aboard ships. There were some exceptions, including Rahmah ibn Jabir al-Jalhami, a well-known pirate of the Persian Gulf, who wore an eye patch after losing an eye in battle.

It has been suggested that pirates before electric lighting wore eyepatches to keep one eye adjusted to darkness ahead of a boarding operation, so that they would be ready to fight below deck where the lighting was poor. Medical texts have referred to the eye patch as a "pirate's patch" and, writing in the Minnesota Academy of Sciences Journal in 1934, Charles Sheard of the Mayo foundation said that by "wearing a patch (the pirate's patch) over one eye, it will keep the covered eye in a state of readiness and adaptation for night vision". This technique was explored during WWII by institutes such as the United States Navy. This idea was tested in an episode of MythBusters in 2007 and found to be plausible, but this application has never been documented in any historical naval manual.

== Notable wearers ==
- Sir Adrian Carton de Wiart
- Ana de Mendoza
- André De Toth
- Andrew Vachss
- Barbara Boggs Sigmund
- Bobby Helms
- Bruce Peterson
- Bushwick Bill
- Charles H. Bonesteel III
- Charles Stourton, 26th Baron Mowbray
- Claus von Stauffenberg
- Dale Chihuly
- Dale D. Myers
- Dan Crenshaw
- Date Masamune
- David Bowie
- Dick Curless
- Dušan Prelević
- Floyd Gibbons
- Francisco de Orellana
- François Coli
- Fritz Lang
- Gabrielle
- George Maciunas
- George Melly
- Jack Coggins
- James Joyce
- Jan Syrový
- Jan Žižka
- Jason Trost
- Jean-Marie Le Pen
- John Ford
- José Millán Astray
- Lewis Williams Douglas
- Lisa Lopes
- Luís de Camões
- María de Villota
- Marie Colvin
- Martin Bayerle
- Maxie Anderson
- Momus
- Moshe Dayan
- Mother Angelica
- Nicholas Ray
- Nick Popaditch
- Nicolas-Jacques Conté
- Norm Clarke
- Olaf Scholz (see Scholz eye patch)
- Patrick Leigh Fermor
- Pete Burns
- Peter Gatien
- Rahmah ibn Jabir al-Jalahimah
- Raoul Walsh
- Ray Sawyer
- Richard Tesařík
- Richard W. Rahn
- Rich Williams
- Ron Hamilton
- Juan José Padilla
- Ruger
- Salman Rushdie
- Sammy Davis Jr.
- Sheila Gish
- Sir Francis Bryan
- Slick Rick
- Victor Page
- Wiley Post
- R. D. Matthews

== In fiction ==
An eyepatch can be used in fiction to lend an additional dimension to a character, an air of mystery or general je ne sais quoi.

== See also ==
- Orthoptist
- Blindfold
- Haploscope
- Diplopia
- Domino mask
- Binocular vision
- Stereopsis
