= Olaf Scholz =

Chancellor of Germany from 2021 to 2025

Olaf Scholz MdB
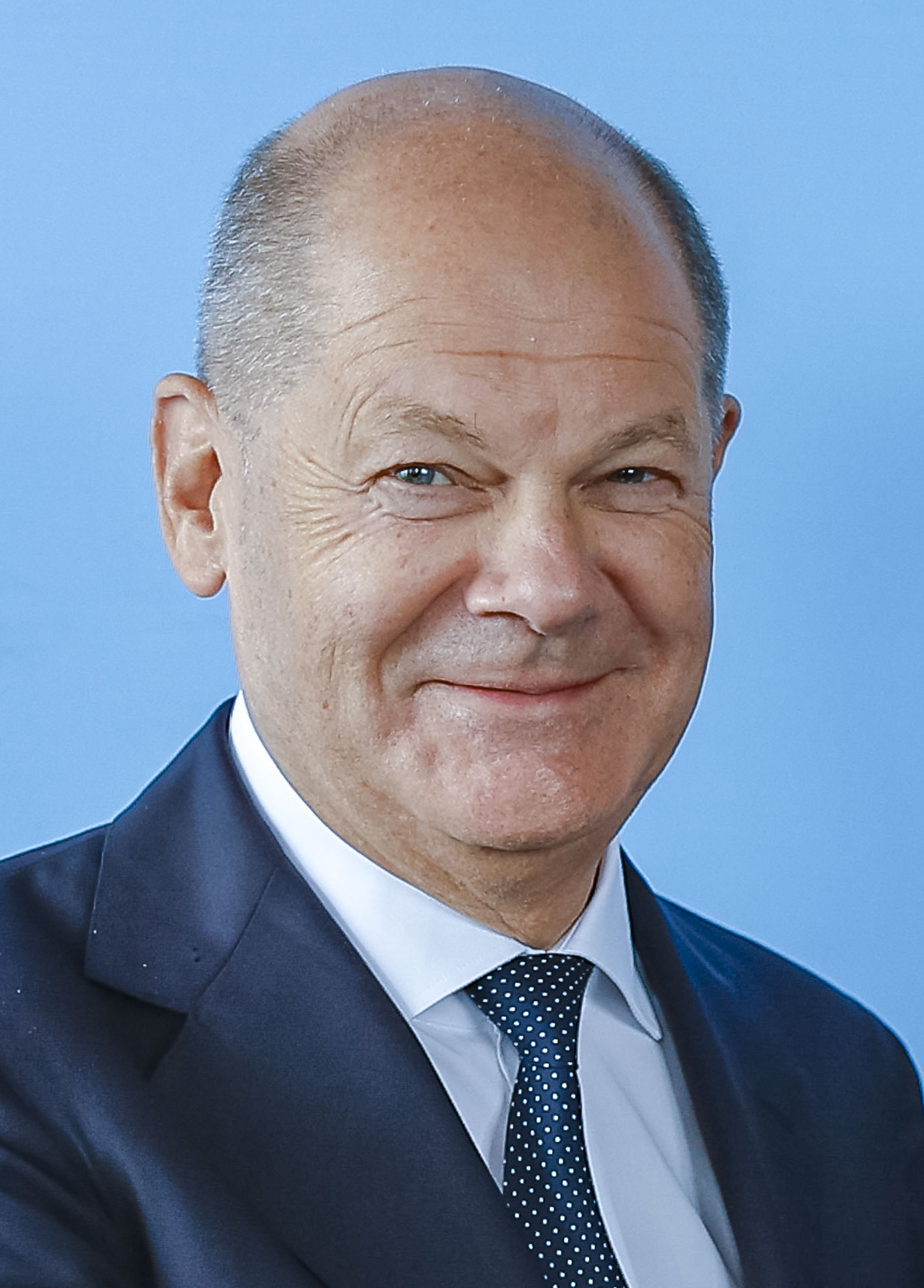
- Scholz in 2024

Chancellor of Germany
- In office 8 December 2021 – 6 May 2025
- President: Frank-Walter Steinmeier
- Vice Chancellor: Robert Habeck
- Preceded by: Angela Merkel
- Succeeded by: Friedrich Merz

Vice Chancellor of Germany
- In office 14 March 2018 – 8 December 2021
- Chancellor: Angela Merkel
- Preceded by: Sigmar Gabriel
- Succeeded by: Robert Habeck

Minister of Finance
- In office 14 March 2018 – 8 December 2021
- Chancellor: Angela Merkel
- Preceded by: Peter Altmaier (acting)
- Succeeded by: Christian Lindner

First Mayor of Hamburg
- In office 7 March 2011 – 13 March 2018
- Second Mayor: Dorothee Stapelfeldt; Katharina Fegebank
- Preceded by: Christoph Ahlhaus
- Succeeded by: Peter Tschentscher
Federal ministerial roles
Minister for Labour and Social Affairs
In office 21 November 2007 – 27 October 2009
Chancellor	Angela Merkel
Preceded by	Franz Müntefering
Succeeded by	Franz Josef Jung
Hamburg state roles
Senator for the Interior of Hamburg
In office 30 May 2001 – 31 October 2001
First Mayor	Ortwin Runde
Preceded by	Hartmuth Wrocklage
Succeeded by	Ronald Schill
Parliamentary constituencies
Member of the Bundestag
Incumbent
Assumed office 26 October 2021
Preceded by	Manja Schüle (2019)
Constituency	Potsdam – Potsdam-Mittelmark II – Teltow-Fläming II
In office 17 October 2002 – 11 March 2011
Preceded by	Himself (2001)
Succeeded by	Ingo Egloff
Constituency	Hamburg-Altona
In office 26 October 1998 – 6 June 2001
Preceded by	Marliese Dobberthien
Succeeded by	Himself (2002)
Constituency	Hamburg-Altona
Member of the Bundesrat for Hamburg
In office 7 March 2011 – 13 March 2018
Preceded by	Christoph Ahlhaus
Succeeded by	Peter Tschentscher
Member of the Hamburg Parliament
In office 2 March 2015 – 2 March 2015
Constituency	State list
In office 7 March 2011 – 11 March 2011
Preceded by	Multi-member district
Succeeded by	Andrea Rugbarth
Constituency	State list
Deputy Member of the Bundesrat for Hamburg
In office 30 May 2001 – 31 October 2001
Appointed by	Ortwin Runde
Preceded by	Hartmuth Wrocklage
Succeeded by	Multi-member district
Party leadership roles
Deputy Leader of the Social Democratic Party in the Bundestag
In office 27 October 2009 – 11 March 2011 Serving with Joachim Poß, Angelica Schwall-Düren, Elke Ferner, Ulrich Kelber, Gernot Erler, Florian Pronold, Dagmar Ziegler, Hubertus Heil, Axel Schäfer
Leader	Frank-Walter Steinmeier
Preceded by	Ludwig Stiegler; Walter Kolbow; Fritz Rudolf Körper; Klaas Hübner; Christel Humme
Succeeded by	Christine Lambrecht
Chief Whip of the Social Democratic Party in the Bundestag
In office 13 October 2005 – 21 November 2007
Leader	Peter Struck
Preceded by	Wilhelm Schmidt
Succeeded by	Thomas Oppermann
General Secretary of the Social Democratic Party
In office 20 October 2002 – 21 March 2004
Leader	Gerhard Schröder
Preceded by	Franz Müntefering
Succeeded by	Klaus Uwe Benneter

Personal details
- Born: 14 June 1958 (age 68) Osnabrück, West Germany
- Party: Social Democratic (since 1975)
- Spouse: Britta Ernst (m. 1998)
- Education: University of Hamburg
- Website: olaf-scholz.spd.de

Olaf Scholz (Note: German: [ˈoːlaf ˈʃɔlts]) (born 14 June 1958) is a German politician who served as the chancellor of Germany from 2021 to 2025. A member of the Social Democratic Party (SPD), he previously served as Vice Chancellor in the fourth Merkel cabinet and as Federal Minister of Finance from 2018 to 2021. He was also First Mayor of Hamburg from 2011 to 2018, deputy leader of the SPD from 2009 to 2019, and Federal Minister of Labour and Social Affairs from 2007 to 2009.

Scholz was born in Osnabrück, Lower Saxony, and grew up in Hamburg. After graduating from high school, he studied law at the University of Hamburg. Scholz began his career as a lawyer specialising in labour and employment law. He became a member of the SPD in the 1970s and was a member of the Bundestag from 1998 to 2011. Scholz served in the Hamburg Government under First Mayor Ortwin Runde in 2001 and became general secretary of the SPD in 2002, where he served alongside SPD leader and then-chancellor Gerhard Schröder. He became his party's chief whip in the Bundestag, later entering the First Merkel Government in 2007 as Federal Minister for Labour and Social Affairs. After the SPD moved into the opposition following the 2009 federal election, Scholz returned to lead the SPD in Hamburg. He was then elected deputy leader of the SPD. He led his party to victory in the 2011 Hamburg state election and became the first mayor, a position he held until 2018.

After the Social Democratic Party entered the fourth Merkel government in 2018, Scholz was appointed as both minister of finance and Vice Chancellor of Germany. In 2020, he was nominated as the SPD's candidate for Chancellor of Germany for the 2021 federal election. The party won a plurality of seats in the Bundestag and formed a "traffic light coalition" with Alliance 90/The Greens and the Free Democratic Party. On 8 December 2021, Scholz was elected and sworn in as chancellor by the Bundestag, succeeding Angela Merkel.

As chancellor, Scholz oversaw Germany's response to the Russian invasion of Ukraine. Despite giving a restrained and timid response compared to many other Western leaders, Scholz oversaw a significant increase in the German defence budget, weapons shipments to Ukraine, and the Nord Stream 2 pipeline was put on hold. Three days after the invasion, Scholz set out the principles of a new German defence policy in his Zeitenwende speech. In September 2022, three of the four Nord Stream pipelines were destroyed. During the Gaza war, he authorized substantial German military and medical aid to Israel, and denounced the actions of Hamas and other Palestinian militant groups. In November 2023, the Federal Constitutional Court demanded budget cuts totaling €60 billion to ensure the government would not surpass debt limits as set in the constitution; this proved a significant challenge for Scholz's cabinet and contributed to the 2023–2024 protests. On 6 November 2024, his government majority collapsed as he dismissed Christian Lindner from the post of Federal Minister of Finance and broke up the coalition agreement. On 16 December 2024, Scholz lost a vote of confidence and in the following snap election on 23 February 2025, his SPD lost to Friedrich Merz's CDU, placing third (behind Union and AfD) for the lowest result in its post-war history.

== Early life and education ==
Olaf Scholz was born on 14 June 1958, in Osnabrück, Lower Saxony, and grew up in Hamburg's Rahlstedt district. His parents worked in the textile industry. He has two younger brothers, Jens Scholz, an anesthesiologist and CEO of the University Medical Center Schleswig Holstein; and Ingo Scholz, a tech entrepreneur.

Scholz attended the Bekassinenau elementary school in Oldenfelde and then switched to the Großlohering elementary school in Großlohe. After graduating from high school in 1977, he began studying law at the University of Hamburg in 1978 as part of a one-stage legal training course. He later found employment as a lawyer specialising in labour and employment law, working at the law firm Zimmermann, Scholz und Partner. Scholz joined the Social Democratic Party at the age of 17.

Scholz's family is traditionally Lutheran, and he was baptized in the Protestant Church in Germany. He holds largely secular political views, and left the Church in adulthood, but has emphasised a need for appreciation of Germany's Christian heritage and culture.

== Political career ==
=== Early political career ===
==== Young socialist (1975–1989) ====
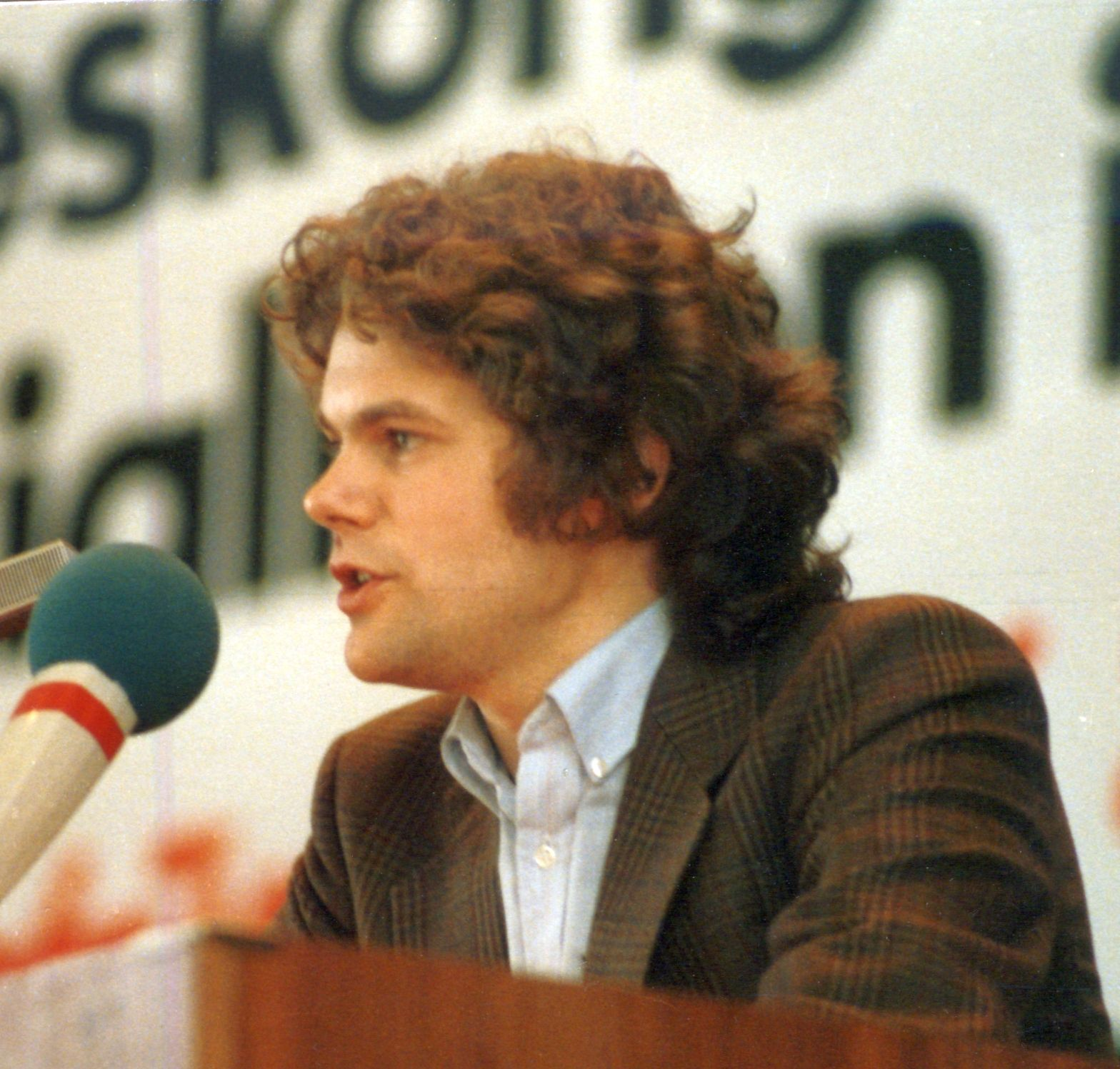
Scholz at the Young Socialists Congress, 1984

Olaf Scholz joined the SPD in 1975 as a student, where he came into contact with the Jusos, the youth organization of the SPD. From 1982 to 1988, he was Deputy Federal Chairman of the Jusos. Scholz was also Vice President of the International Union of Socialist Youth from 1987 to 1989. He supported the Freudenberger Kreis, a Marxist wing of the Jusos' university groups, arguing that society should "overcome the capitalist economy" in one of his publications. In it, Scholz criticized the "aggressive-imperialist NATO", the Federal Republic as the "European stronghold of big business" and the social-liberal coalition, which puts the "bare maintenance of power above any form of substantive dispute". Referring to this period in his life, Scholz later said that he "made almost all possible mistakes at some point".

On 4 January 1984, Olaf Scholz and other Juso leaders attended a meeting in East Germany with Egon Krenz, then secretary of the Central Committee of the SED, and Herbert Häber, member of the Politburo of the SED-Central Committee. In 1987, Scholz crossed the inner-German border again and stood up for disarmament agreements as Juso-Vice at an FDJ peace rally in Wittenberg alongside FDJ head Eberhard Aurich.

==== Member of the Bundestag (1998–2001) ====
Scholz was elected to his first political office as a Deputy Member of the Bundestag representing the constituency of Hamburg-Altona in 1998, aged 40. During his tenure, Scholz served on the Committee for Labour and Social Matters. In the committee of inquiry into the visa affair of the Bundestag, he was chairman of the SPD parliamentary group. Scholz resigned his mandate on 6 June 2001, to take office as Senator. Because his seat was an overhang seat, it was not filled until the 2002 German federal election.

==== Senator for the Interior of Hamburg (2001) ====
On 30 May 2001, Scholz succeeded Hartmuth Wrocklage to become Senator for the Interior of Hamburg in the Senate led by Mayor Ortwin Runde. Wrocklage had resigned due to allegations of nepotism. He also succeeded Wrocklage as Deputy Member of the Bundesrat.

During his brief time as Senator, Scholz approved the involuntary use of emetics to gather evidence from suspected drug dealers. The measure was controversial: the Hamburg Medical Chamber expressed disapproval of this practice due to potential health risks as did his then coalition partner GAL calling it "a serious violation of privacy and physical integrity" and the practice was ruled illegal in 2006 by the European Court of Human Rights.

Scholz left office in October 2001, after the defeat of his party at the 2001 Hamburg state election and the election of Ole von Beust as First Mayor. His successor was Ronald Schill, who had won on a Law and order platform, with an emphasis on harsh penalties for drug dealers.

=== Federal and state political career ===
==== Member of the Bundestag (2002–2011) ====
Scholz was elected again to the Bundestag in the 2002 German federal election. From 2002 to 2004, Scholz also served as General Secretary of the SPD; he resigned from that office when party leader and Chancellor Gerhard Schröder, facing disaffection within his own party and hampered by persistently low public approval ratings, announced he would step down as Leader of the Social Democratic Party.

Scholz was one of a series of politicians who sparked debate over the German journalistic norm of allowing interviewees to "authorize" and amend quotes before publication. This came after his press team insisted on extensively editing an interview with Die Tageszeitung in 2003. Die Tageszeitung editor Bascha Mika condemned the norm as a "betrayal of the claim to a free press", and the newspaper ultimately published the interview with Scholz's answers blacked out.

Scholz served as the SPD spokesperson on the inquiry committee investigating the 2005 German Visa Affair. Following the federal election later that year, he served as First Parliamentary Secretary of the SPD Bundestag Group. He also became Chief Whip of the Social Democratic Party. In this capacity, he worked closely with the CDU Chief Whip Norbert Röttgen to manage and defend the grand coalition led by Chancellor Angela Merkel in the Bundestag. Scholz also served as a member of the Parliamentary Oversight Panel, which provides parliamentary oversight of the German federal intelligence services; the BND, MAD and BfV.

==== Minister of Labour and Social Affairs (2007–2009) ====
In 2007, Scholz was appointed to serve as Minister of Labour and Social Affairs in the first Merkel Government, succeeding Franz Müntefering.

Following the 2009 federal election, when the SPD left the Government, Scholz was elected as Deputy Leader of the SPD, replacing Frank-Walter Steinmeier. Between 2009 and 2011, he was also a member of the SPD group's Afghanistan/Pakistan Task Force. In 2010, he participated in the annual Bilderberg Meeting in Sitges, Spain.

==== First Mayor of Hamburg (2011–2018) ====
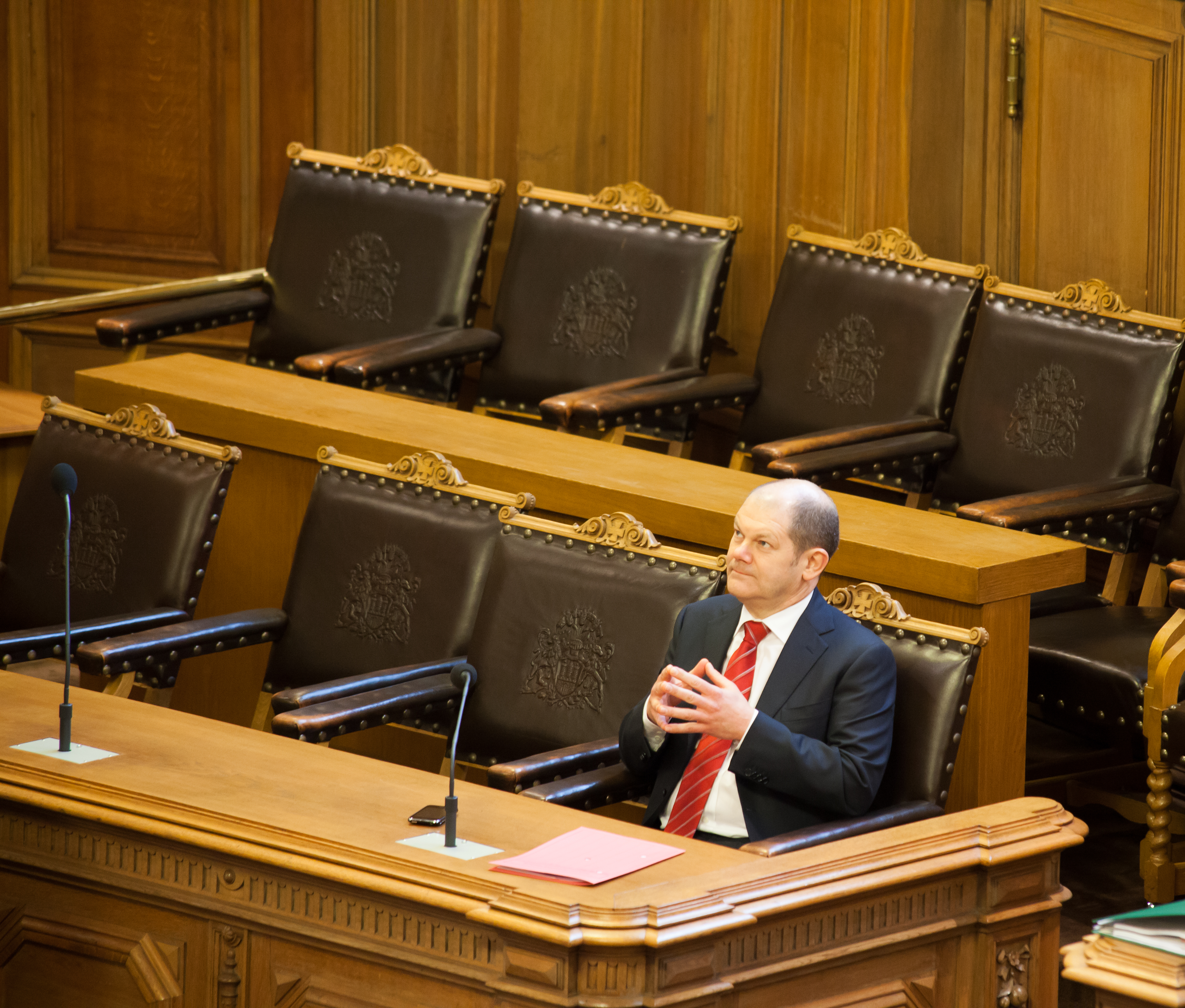
Scholz in March 2011, on the government benches in the Hamburg Parliament, shortly after his election as First Mayor

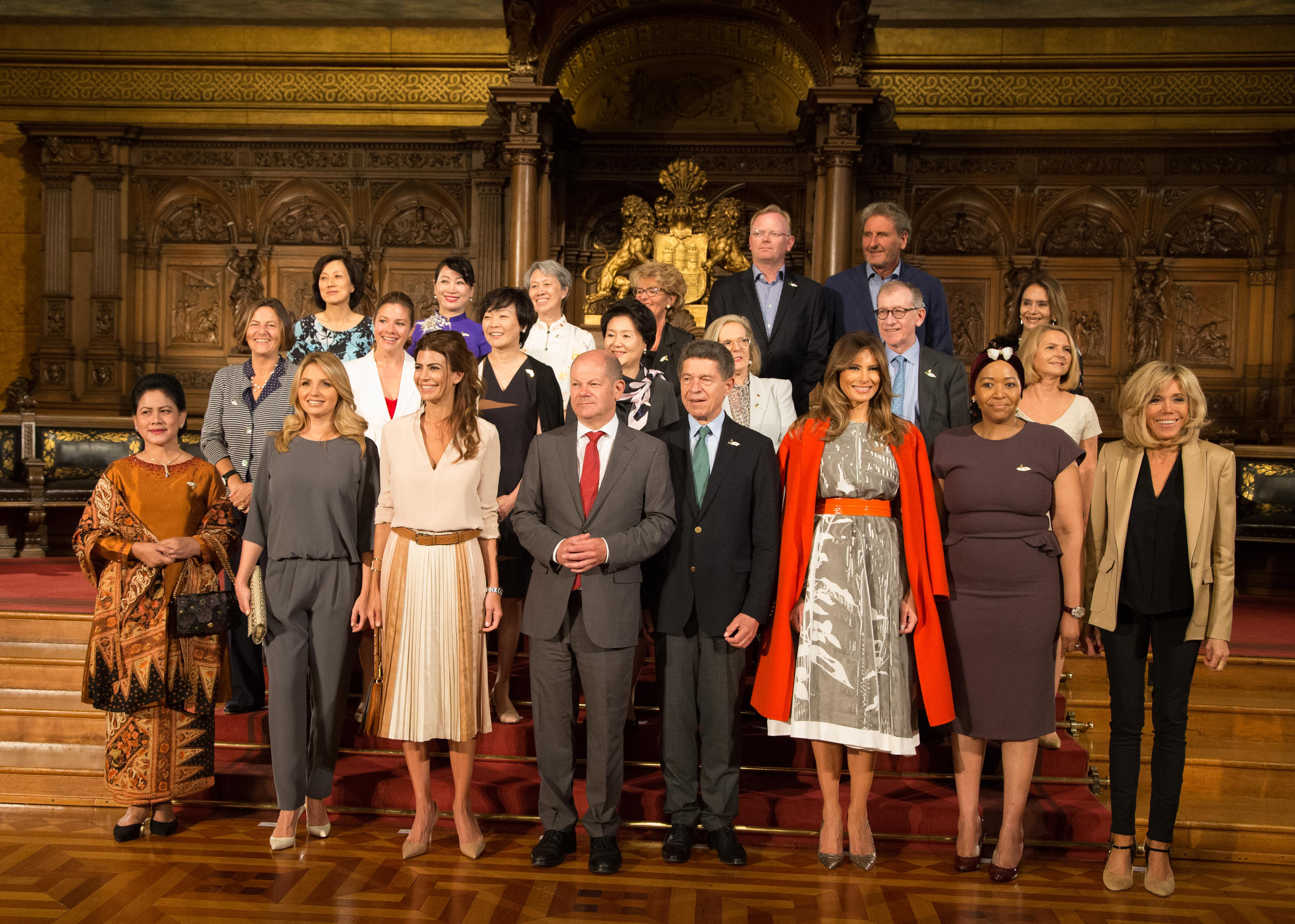
Scholz and the spouses of the heads of state and government at the G20 in Hamburg, 2017

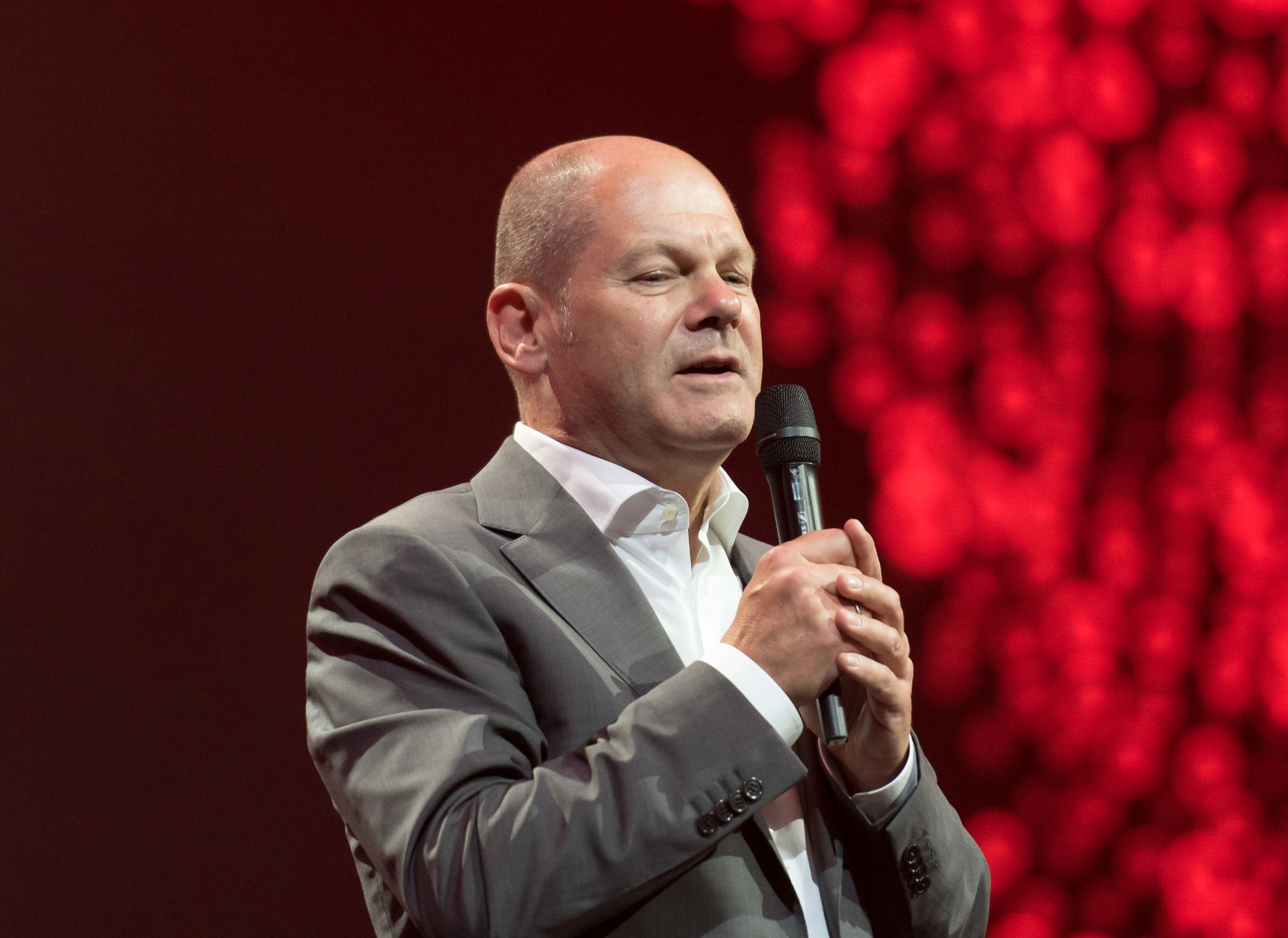
Scholz speaking at the Global Citizen Festival 2017 in Hamburg

In 2011, Scholz was the lead SPD candidate at the Hamburg state election, which the SPD won with 48.3% of the votes, taking 62 of 121 seats in the Hamburg Parliament. Scholz resigned as a Member of the Bundestag on 11 March 2011, days after his formal election as First Mayor of Hamburg; Dorothee Stapelfeldt, also a Social Democrat, was appointed his Deputy First Mayor.

In his capacity as First Mayor, Scholz represented Hamburg and Germany internationally. On 7 June 2011, Scholz attended the state dinner hosted by President Barack Obama in honor of Chancellor Angela Merkel at the White House. As host of Hamburg's annual St. Matthias' Day banquet for the city's civic and business leaders, he brought several notable guests of honour to the city, including Jean-Marc Ayrault, Prime Minister of France, in 2013; David Cameron, Prime Minister of the United Kingdom, in 2016; and Justin Trudeau, Prime Minister of Canada, in 2017. From 2015 until 2018, Scholz also served as Commissioner of the Federal Republic of Germany for Cultural Affairs under the Treaty on Franco-German Cooperation.

In 2013, Scholz opposed a public initiative aiming at a complete buyback of energy grids that the city of Hamburg had sold to utilities Vattenfall Europe AG and E.ON decades before, he argued this would overburden the city, whose debt stood at more than €20B at the time.

Scholz was asked to participate in exploratory talks between the CDU, CSU and SPD parties to form a coalition government following the 2013 federal election. In the subsequent negotiations, he led the SPD delegation in the financial policy working group; his co-chair from the CDU/CSU was Finance Minister Wolfgang Schäuble. Alongside fellow Social Democrats Jörg Asmussen and Thomas Oppermann, Scholz was reported in the media to be a possible successor to Schäuble in the post of Finance Minister at the time; whilst Schäuble remained in post, the talks to form a coalition were ultimately successful.

In a paper compiled in late 2014, Scholz and Schäuble proposed redirecting revenue from the solidarity surcharge on income and corporate tax (Solidaritätszuschlag) to subsidize the federal states' interest payments. Under Scholz's leadership, the Social Democrats won the 2015 state election in Hamburg, receiving around 47% of the vote. He formed a coalition government with the Green Party, with Green leader Katharina Fegebank being appointed to serve as Deputy First Mayor. In 2015, Scholz led Hamburg's bid to host the 2024 Summer Olympics with an estimated budget of €11.2B (US$12.6B), competing against Los Angeles, Paris, Rome, and Budapest. In a referendum, the citizens of Hamburg later rejected the city's candidacy, with more than half voting against the project. Later that year, Scholz – alongside Minister-President Torsten Albig of Schleswig-Holstein – negotiated a debt-restructuring deal with the European Commission. The deal allowed German regional lender HSH Nordbank to offload €6.2B in problematic assets, primarily underperforming ship loans, onto its government majority owners and avoid being shut down, saving around 2,500 jobs. In 2017, Scholz was criticised for his handling of riots that took place during the G20 summit in Hamburg.

In late 2021, Scholz was widely criticised for his handling of the CumEx tax fraud at M. M. Warburg & Co., when he was the mayor of Hamburg.

==== Vice Chancellor and Minister of Finance (2018–2021) ====
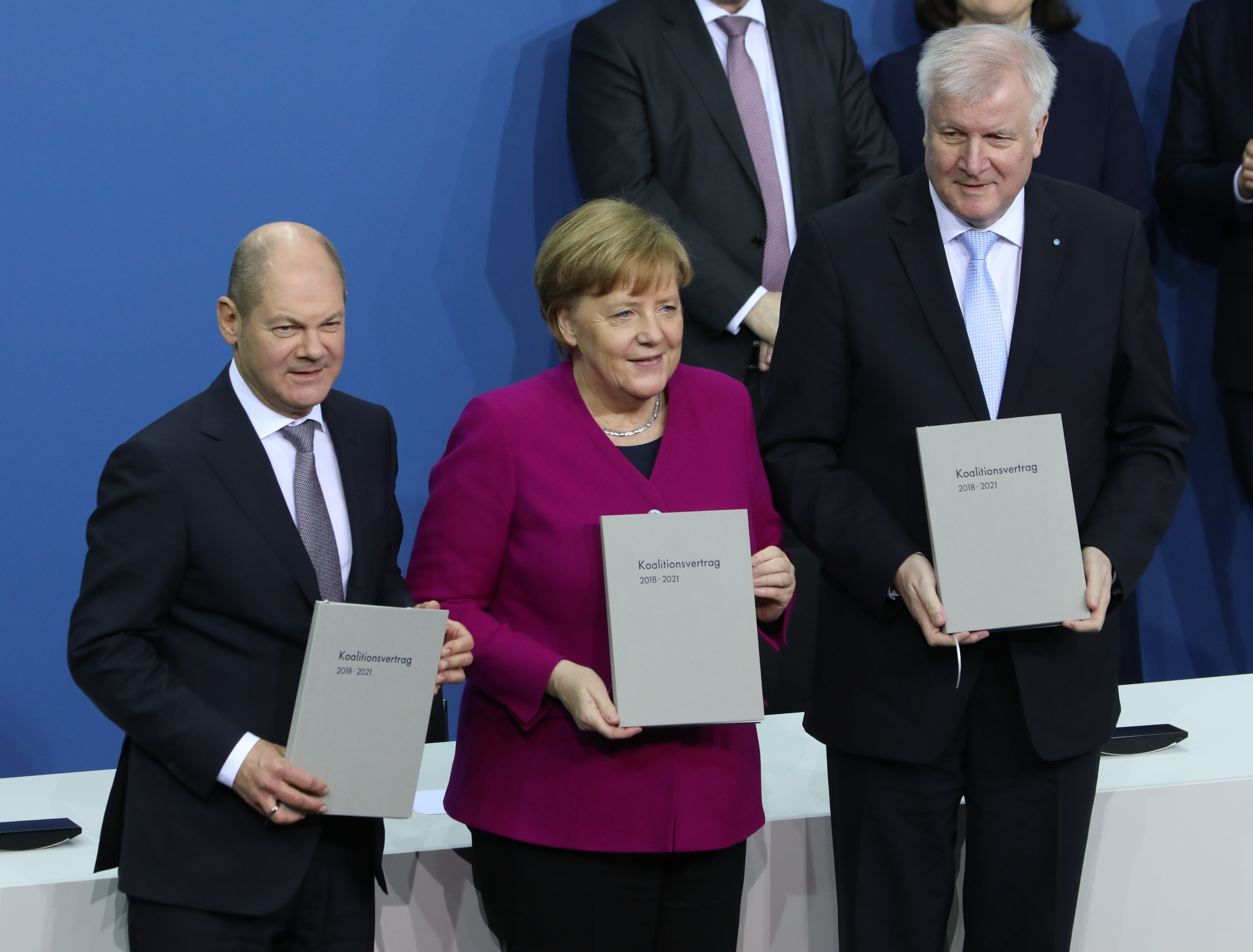
Scholz (SPD), Angela Merkel (CDU) and Horst Seehofer (CSU) presenting the 2018 coalition agreement for Germany's fourth Merkel cabinet

After a lengthy period of inter-party negotiations following the 2017 federal election, during which the CDU, CSU and SPD agreed to continue in coalition, Scholz was appointed Federal Minister of Finance. Scholz was sworn in alongside the rest of the fourth Merkel cabinet on 14 March 2018, also taking the role of Vice Chancellor of Germany under Angela Merkel. Within his first months in office, Scholz became one of Germany's most popular politicians, reaching an approval rating of 50%.

In 2019, Scholz ran for leader of the SPD, but lost to Norbert Walter-Borjans.

In response to the COVID-19 pandemic in Germany, Scholz drafted a series of financial rescue packages for the country's economy, including a €130B stimulus package in June 2020. The stimulus package included support for businesses and freelancers as well as a decision to keep factories open. This is often credited as having prevented mass layoffs, and the effects of the COVID-19 financial crisis on the German economy were initially relatively low. Scholz also oversaw the allocation of funding received from Next Generation EU, the European Union's €750B COVID-19 recovery fund. 90% of the €28B available to Germany was invested into climate protection and digitization.

At the G7 summit in June 2021, the G7 agreed on a global minimum corporate tax rate of at least 15%, which had been proposed by Scholz. Scholz is credited as having convinced President of the United States Joe Biden to agree to the proposal, which his predecessor Donald Trump had been opposed to. Also in June 2021, Scholz oversaw the Federal Central Tax Office's purchase of information regarding German citizens using Dubai for tax avoidance and evasion.

Scholz was criticized in the context of the Wirecard scandal; serious misconduct by the Federal Financial Supervisory Authority (BaFin), which is under the responsibility of the Federal Ministry of Finance, is alleged to have contributed to the longevity of the fraudulent business. During Scholz's time in office, the Ministry of Finance was one of the subjects of parliamentary inquiry into the scandal, but Scholz has denied any personal responsibility. Having vowed to strengthen financial market supervision, he replaced BaFin president Felix Hufeld.

==== Candidate for SPD co-leadership (2019) ====
In June 2019, Scholz initially ruled out a candidacy for the party co-leadership following the resignation of Andrea Nahles. He explained that a simultaneous activity as Federal Minister of Finance and party leader was "not possible in terms of time". However, in August, Scholz announced his intention to run for party chairmanship with Klara Geywitz. He said that many of his preferred candidates had not run for office, expressing a sense of "responsibility". Of the six candidate duos standing for election, the Geywitz-Scholz due received the most votes in the first round of the membership elections on 26 October 2019, with 22.7%. They qualified for the runoff election with the second-placed team Saskia Esken and Norbert Walter-Borjans, which had received 21.0% of the vote.

On 30 November 2019, it was announced that Esken and Walter-Borjans had received 53.1% of the vote in the runoff election, with Geywitz and Scholz only receiving 45.3%. This was seen as an upset victory for the left wing of the SPD, including skeptics of the grand coalition with the CDU. Esken and Walter-Borjans were little-known to the public at large, Esken being a backbencher in the Bundestag and Walter-Borjans being the former Minister of Finance of North Rhine-Westphalia from 2010 to 2017. Scholz, on the other hand, had the backing of much of the party establishment.

==== SPD chancellor candidate (2021) ====
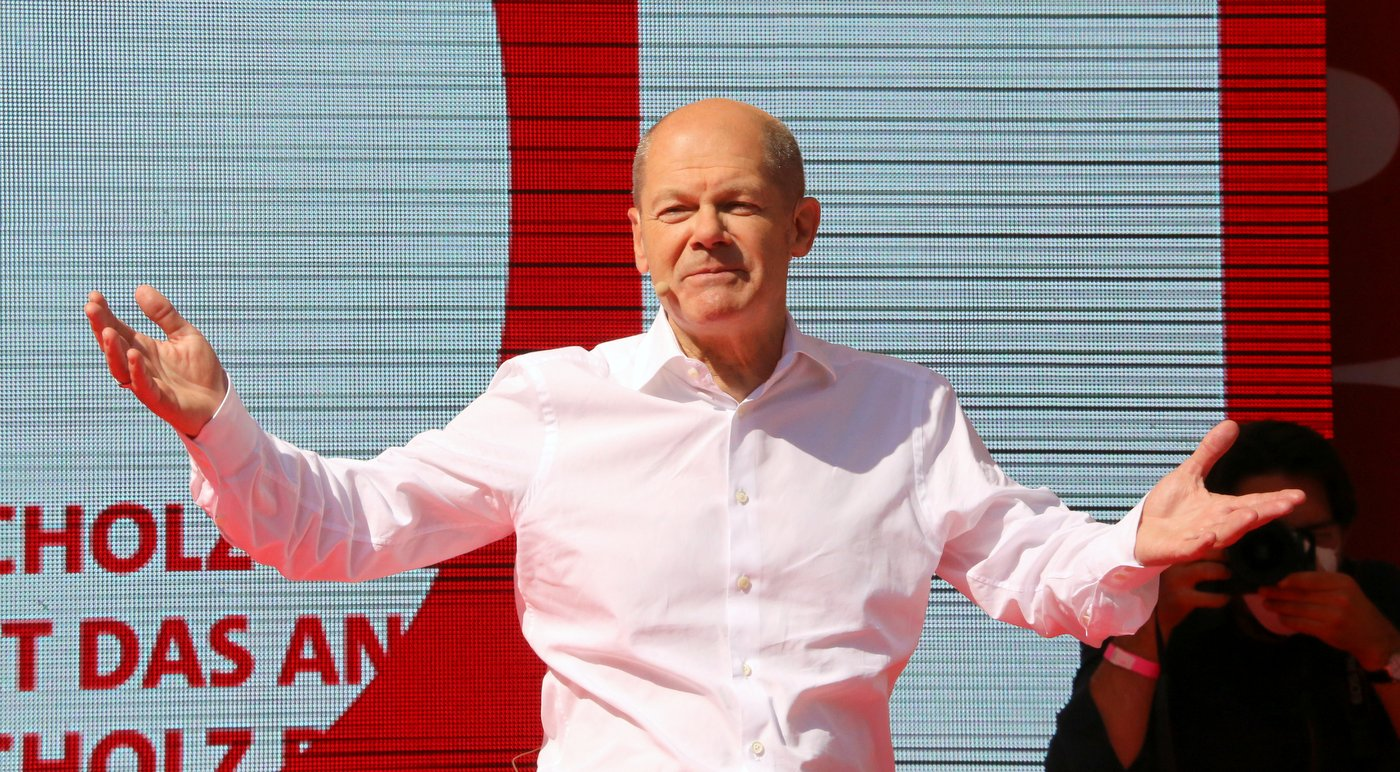
Scholz at an election campaign event

On 10 August 2020, SPD party leadership agreed that it would nominate Scholz to be the party's candidate for Chancellor of Germany at the 2021 federal election. Scholz is usually grouped with the moderate wing of the SPD, and his nomination was seen by Die Tageszeitung as marking a decline of the party's left.

Scholz led the SPD to a narrow victory in the election, with the party receiving 25.8% of the second votes and 206 seats in the Bundestag. Following this victory, Scholz was widely considered to be the most likely next Chancellor of Germany in a traffic light coalition with The Greens and the Free Democratic Party.

On 24 November, the SPD, Green and FDP reached a coalition agreement, naming Scholz as the new German chancellor.

== Chancellor of Germany (2021–2025) ==
Scholz was elected as chancellor by the Bundestag on 8 December 2021, with 395 votes in favour and 303 against. His new government was appointed on the same day by President Frank-Walter Steinmeier. At 63 years, 177 days of age, Scholz was the oldest person to become chancellor since Konrad Adenauer, who was 73 years, 253 days old when he assumed office on 15 September 1949. Friedrich Merz, who replaced Scholz in May 2025, then surpassed this record aged 69.

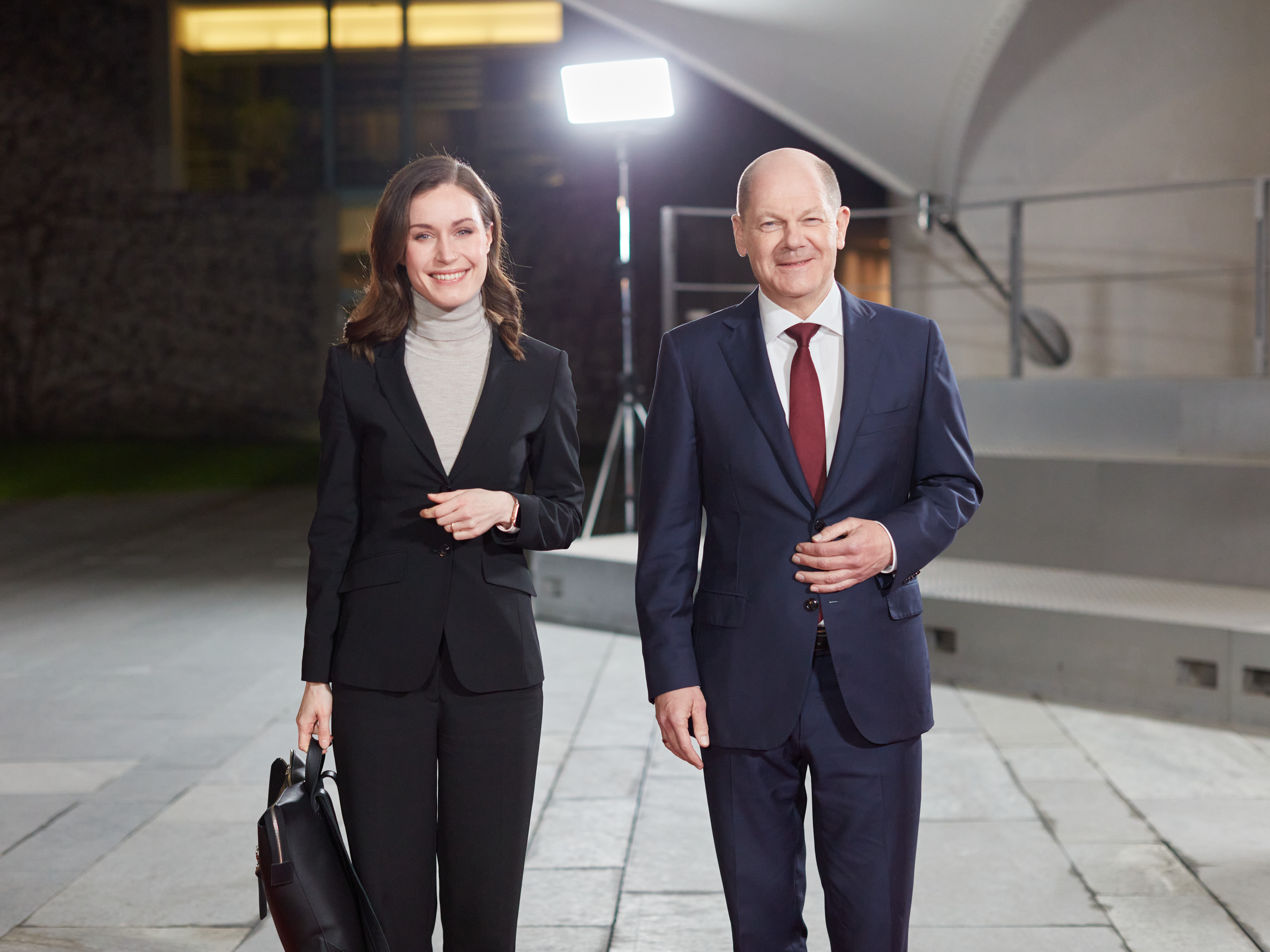
Scholz and Finnish prime minister Sanna Marin in 2022

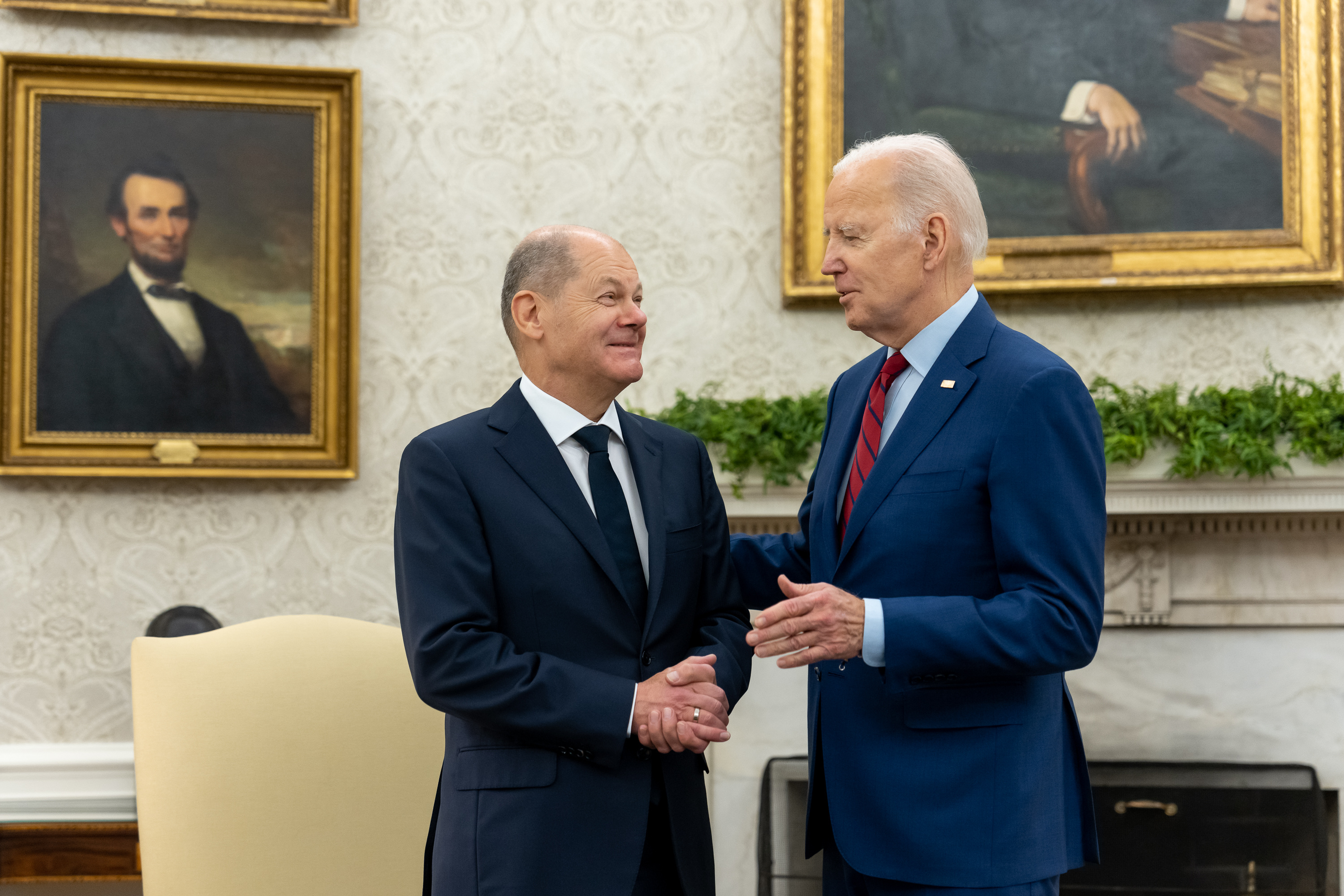
Scholz with US President Joe Biden in March 2023

=== Foreign policy ===
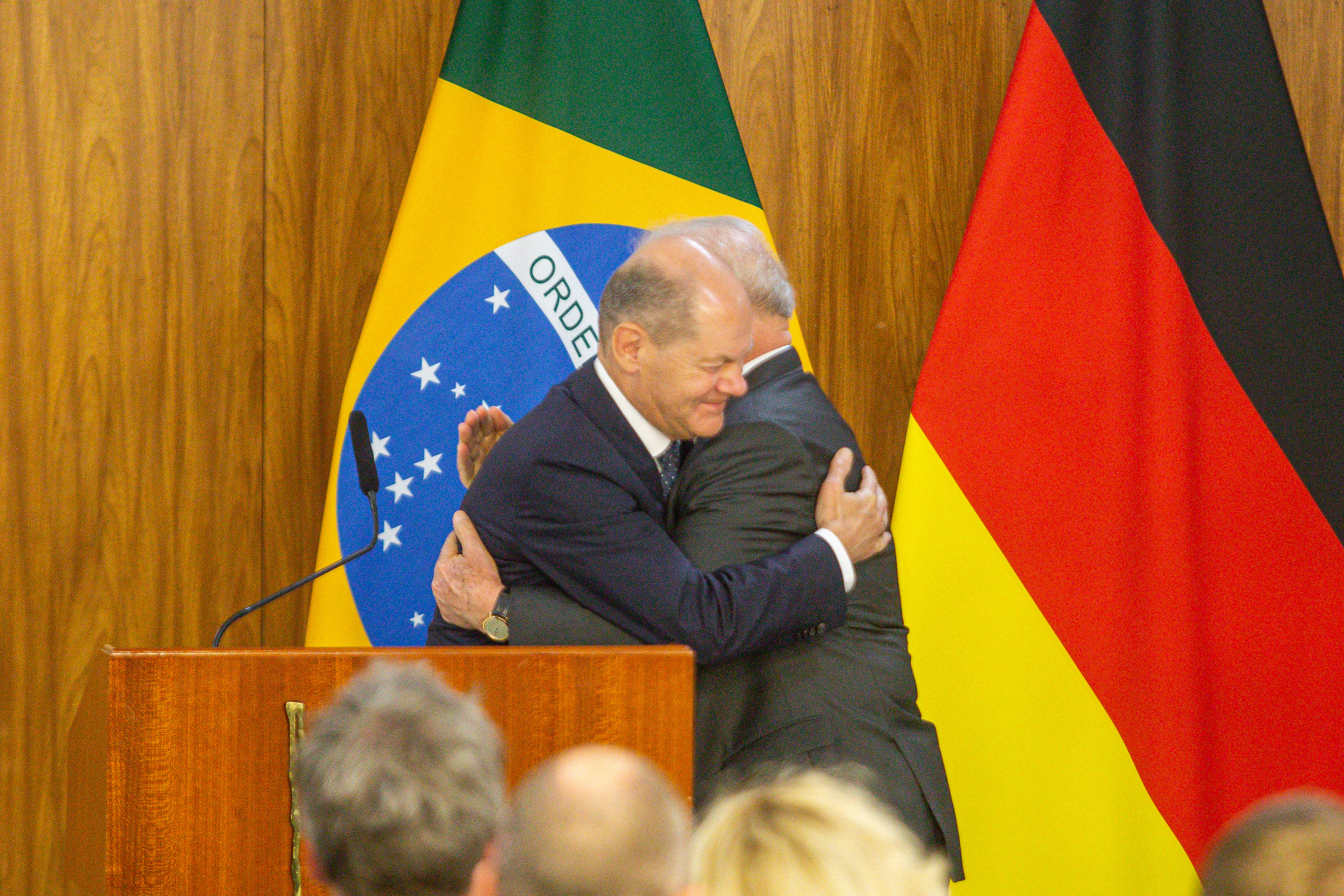
Scholz with Brazilian President Luiz Inácio Lula da Silva in Brasília, Brazil, on 30 January 2023

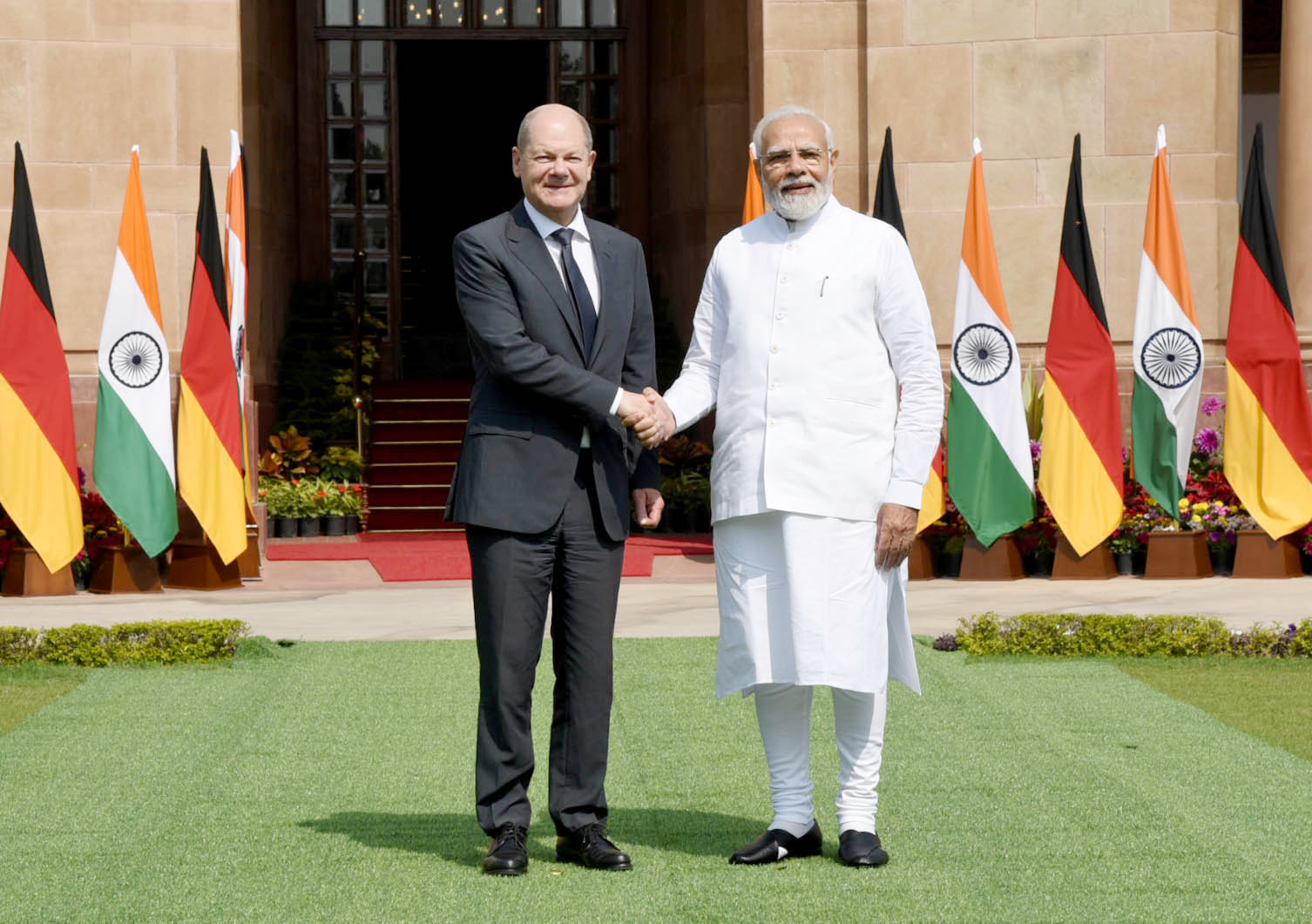
Scholz with Indian Prime Minister Narendra Modi in New Delhi, India, on 25 February 2023

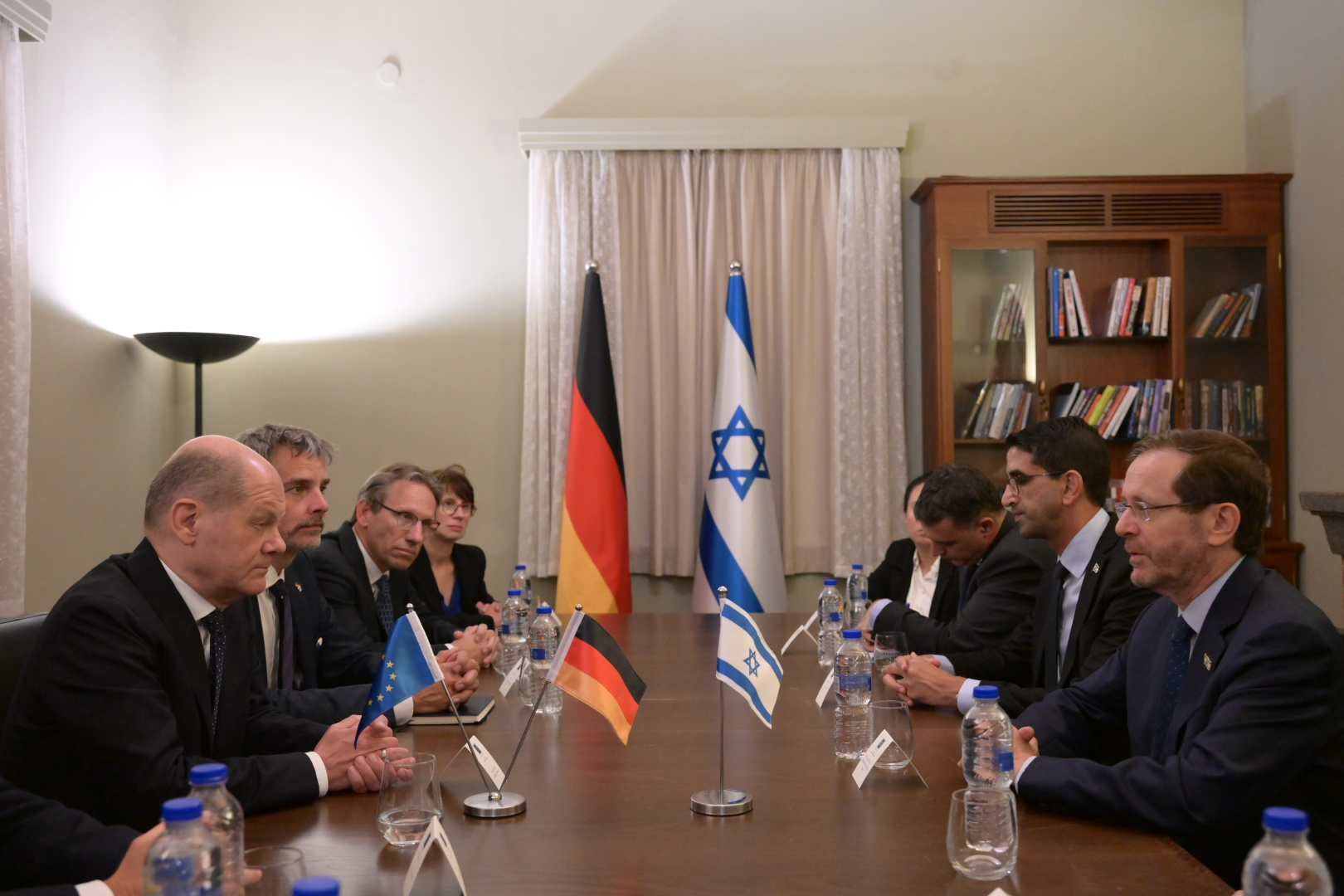
Scholz with Israeli President Isaac Herzog in Tel Aviv, 17 October 2023

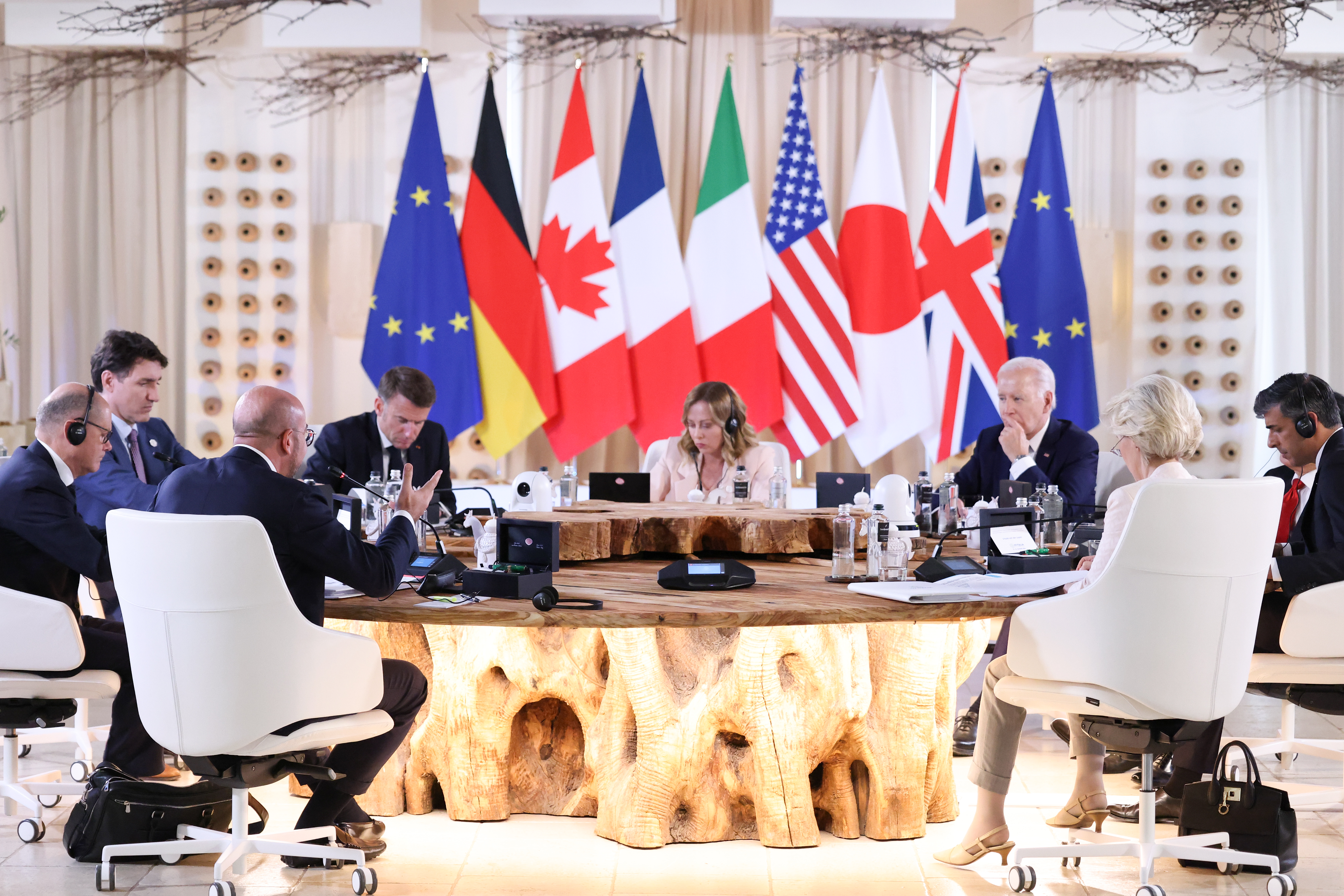
Scholz with Justin Trudeau, Giorgia Meloni, Rishi Sunak and other leaders at the 50th G7 summit in Italy, 13 June 2024

In December 2021, Scholz travelled to Warsaw for talks with Polish prime minister Mateusz Morawiecki, where they discussed the Nord Stream 2 gas pipeline, which would bring Russian gas under the Baltic Sea to Germany and bypass Poland, and Poland's dispute with the European Union over the primacy of EU law. Scholz backed Poland's efforts to stop the flow of migrants seeking entry from Belarus.

Scholz extended into 2022 the suspension of the sale of weapons to Saudi Arabia. The decision was made to "no longer approve any export sales to countries as long as they are directly involved" in the Saudi Arabian-led intervention in Yemen. In September 2022, Scholz visited the United Arab Emirates, Qatar and Saudi Arabia, seeking to deepen ties with the Arab states of the Persian Gulf and find alternative sources of energy. Saudi Arabia's Crown Prince Mohammed bin Salman received Scholz in Jeddah. Scholz's government approved new arms export deals to Saudi Arabia, despite a ban imposed as a result of the Saudi war in Yemen and the assassination of Saudi journalist Jamal Khashoggi.

Scholz called the United States "Europe's closest and most important partner". Upon assuming the chancellorship in December 2021, he stated he would soon be meeting with President Joe Biden, saying: "It is now clear what binds us together."

On 22 February 2022, Scholz announced that Germany would be halting its approval of the Nord Stream 2 pipeline in response to Russia's recognition of two self-declared separatist republics within Ukraine. Scholz spoke against allowing the European Union to cut Russia off from the SWIFT global interbank payment system.

In an emergency meeting of the Bundestag on 27 February, Scholz made the Zeitenwende speech, announcing a complete reversal of German military and foreign policy, including the commencement of weapons shipments to Ukraine and a €100 billion increase in Germany's defense budget. Scholz succeeded in obtaining the two-thirds majority necessary to amend the debt ceiling to allow Germany to establish a 100 billion euro defense fund that would not be subject to the restrictions. One reporter called it a path to "an emergency military modernization, defence spending, energy independence from Russia, lethal assistance for Ukraine and EU financing for weaponry". However, in a press conference on 19 April, Scholz spoke about slowing Germany's provision of weaponry to Ukraine, which was seen as reducing the scale of the policy change.

In June 2022, Scholz said that his government remains committed to phasing out nuclear power despite rising energy prices and Germany's dependence on energy imports from Russia. Former Chancellor Angela Merkel committed Germany to a nuclear power phase-out after the Fukushima nuclear disaster.

In August 2022, Scholz expressed disagreement with the words of Palestinian leader Mahmoud Abbas, who compared Israel's treatment of Palestinians to "apartheid" in South Africa.

Energy-intensive German industry and German exporters were hit particularly hard by the 2021–present global energy crisis. Scholz said: "of course we knew, and we know, that our solidarity with Ukraine will have consequences." On 29 September 2022, Germany presented a €200B plan to support industry and households.

In November 2022, Scholz expressed support for the European Green Deal and reaffirmed Germany's goal of attaining climate neutrality, or net-zero greenhouse gas emissions, by 2045.

On 14 March 2023, Scholz met with Azerbaijani President Ilham Aliyev in Berlin. They discussed the export of natural gas from Azerbaijan to Germany and the European Union. Scholz said that "Azerbaijan is becoming an increasingly important partner for both Germany and the European Union" and stated that Germany does not recognize the Armenian separatist region of Nagorno-Karabakh as an independent republic.

In early May 2023, Scholz met with Ethiopian Prime Minister Abiy Ahmed in Addis Ababa to normalize relations between Germany and Ethiopia, which had been strained by the Tigray War between the Ethiopian government and rebels in Tigray.

In May 2023, Scholz called on all parties involved to resolve the Cyprus dispute, which escalated after the Turkish invasion of Cyprus in 1974 and the subsequent unrecognized occupation of the northern part of the island. He indicated that his preferred solution would be a bizonal federation.

Scholz condemned Hamas' actions during the Gaza war, expressed his support for Israel, and began supporting the nation with military and medical aid. He criticized the Palestinian Authority and Palestinian President Mahmoud Abbas, saying that "their silence is shameful." On 17 October 2023, Scholz arrived in Israel and on the same day warned Iran and Hezbollah not to get involved in the war between Israel and Hamas. He said that "Germany and Israel are united by the fact that they are democratic constitutional states. Our actions are based on law and order, even in extreme situations." On 12 November 2023, Scholz rejected calls for "an immediate ceasefire or long pause" in Israel's war against Hamas in Gaza, saying it would "mean ultimately that Israel leaves Hamas the possibility of recovering and obtaining new missiles".

Speaking at the COP28 climate summit in Dubai in December 2023, Scholz called for a phase-out of fossil fuels, including coal, oil and natural gas, and reiterated Germany's commitment to be climate neutral by 2045, saying, "The technologies are there: wind power, photovoltaics, electric motors, green hydrogen."

In March 2024, Scholz confronted EU foreign policy chief Josep Borrell over his months-long criticism of Israel, saying Borrell did not speak for Germany. On 28 May 2024, Scholz said that his government has no plans to officially recognise a Palestinian state.

In May 2024, Scholz criticized planned EU tariffs on imports of Chinese electric vehicles, saying, "I would like to point out that currently 50% of electric vehicle imports from China in fact come from Western brands that produce vehicles there." In June 2024, Scholz praised Volkswagen AG's move to develop cheaper electric cars for the European market.

In June 2024, Scholz welcomed Argentine President Javier Milei in Berlin. Scholz and Milei expressed support for the EU–Mercosur free trade agreement. Scholz criticized the European Union's trade policy and called on Brussels to speed up negotiations on free trade agreements.

==== Relationship with Poland ====
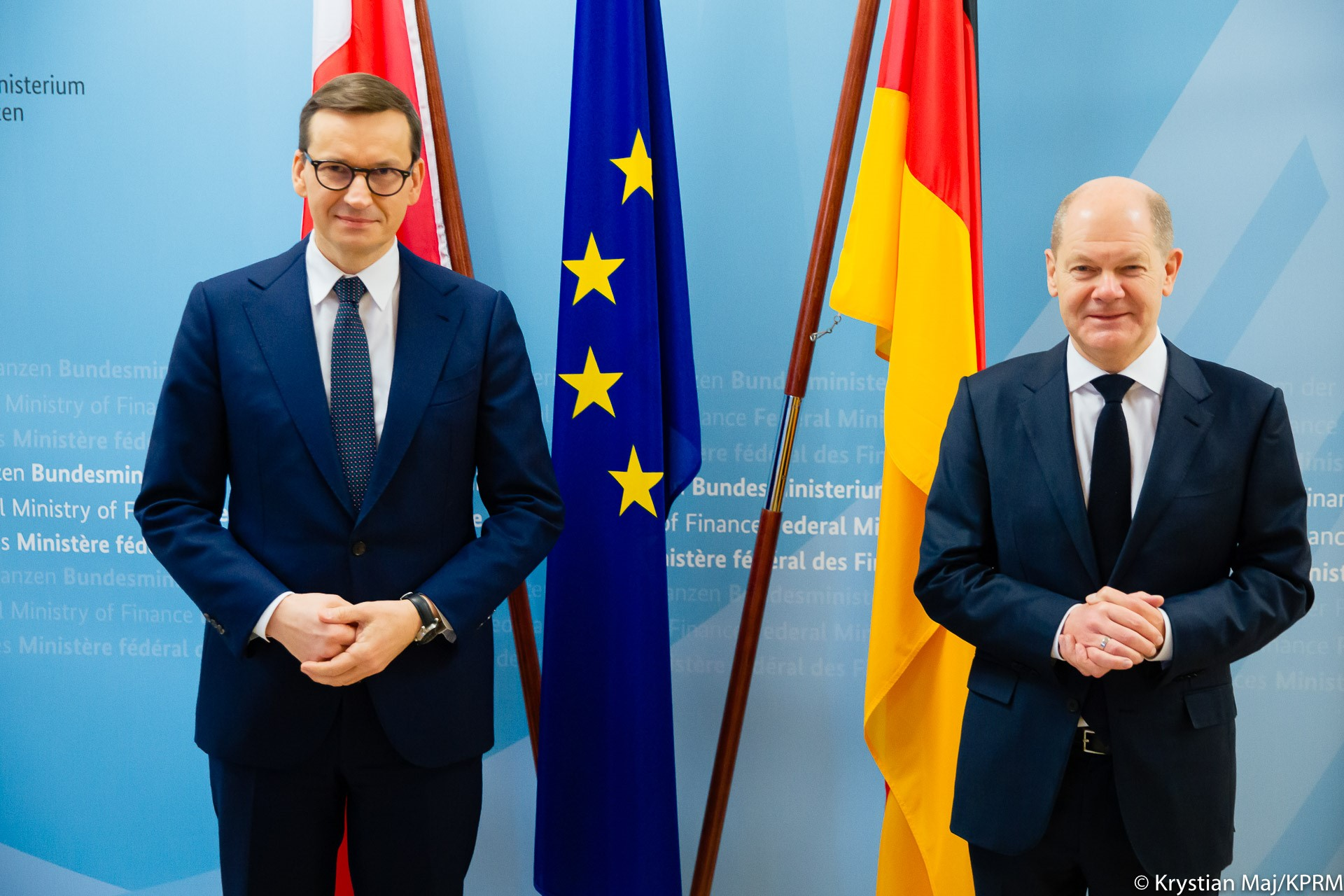
Scholz and Polish Prime Minister Morawiecki in 2021

In December 2021, Scholz rejected the Polish government's claim for further World War II reparations. As a consequence of Nazi German and Soviet Union aggression in World War II, Poland lost about a fifth of its population and much of its industry and infrastructure was destroyed. As a compensation Poland was awarded large parts of eastern Germany at the Potsdam Conference in 1945, with Germany finally renouncing its claims to these territories – including East Prussia, most of Silesia, as well as the eastern parts of Brandenburg and Pomerania – in the Two Plus Four Agreement in 1990. According to the German government, there is no legal basis for further compensation payments. In a meeting with Polish Prime Minister Mateusz Morawiecki, Scholz said "We have concluded treaties that are valid and have settled the past issues and the compensation". Scholz also pointed out that Germany "continues to be willing to pay very, very high contributions to the EU budget", from which Poland has benefited considerably since its accession to the EU.

==== Russian invasion of Ukraine ====
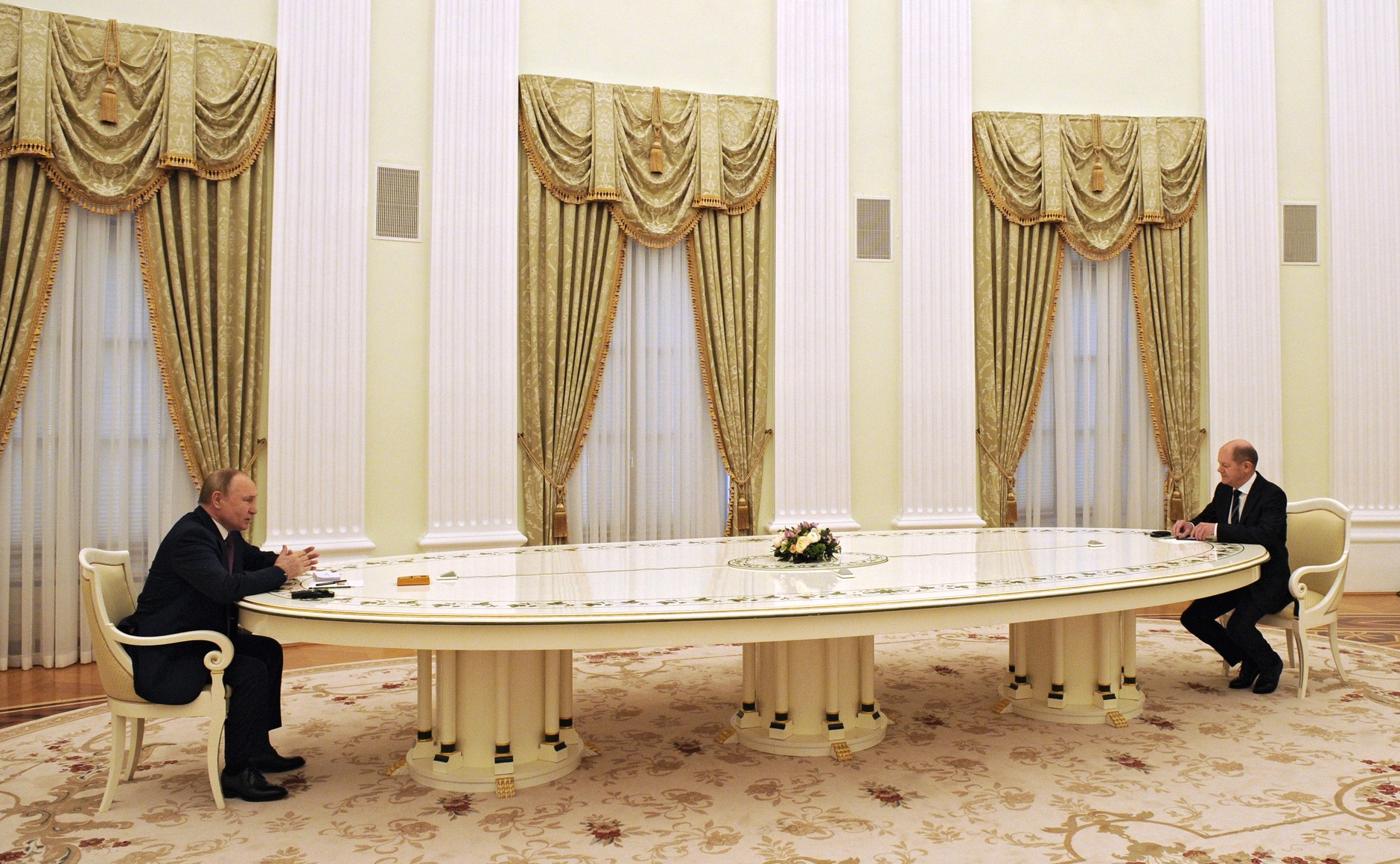
Scholz and Putin in Moscow on 15 February 2022

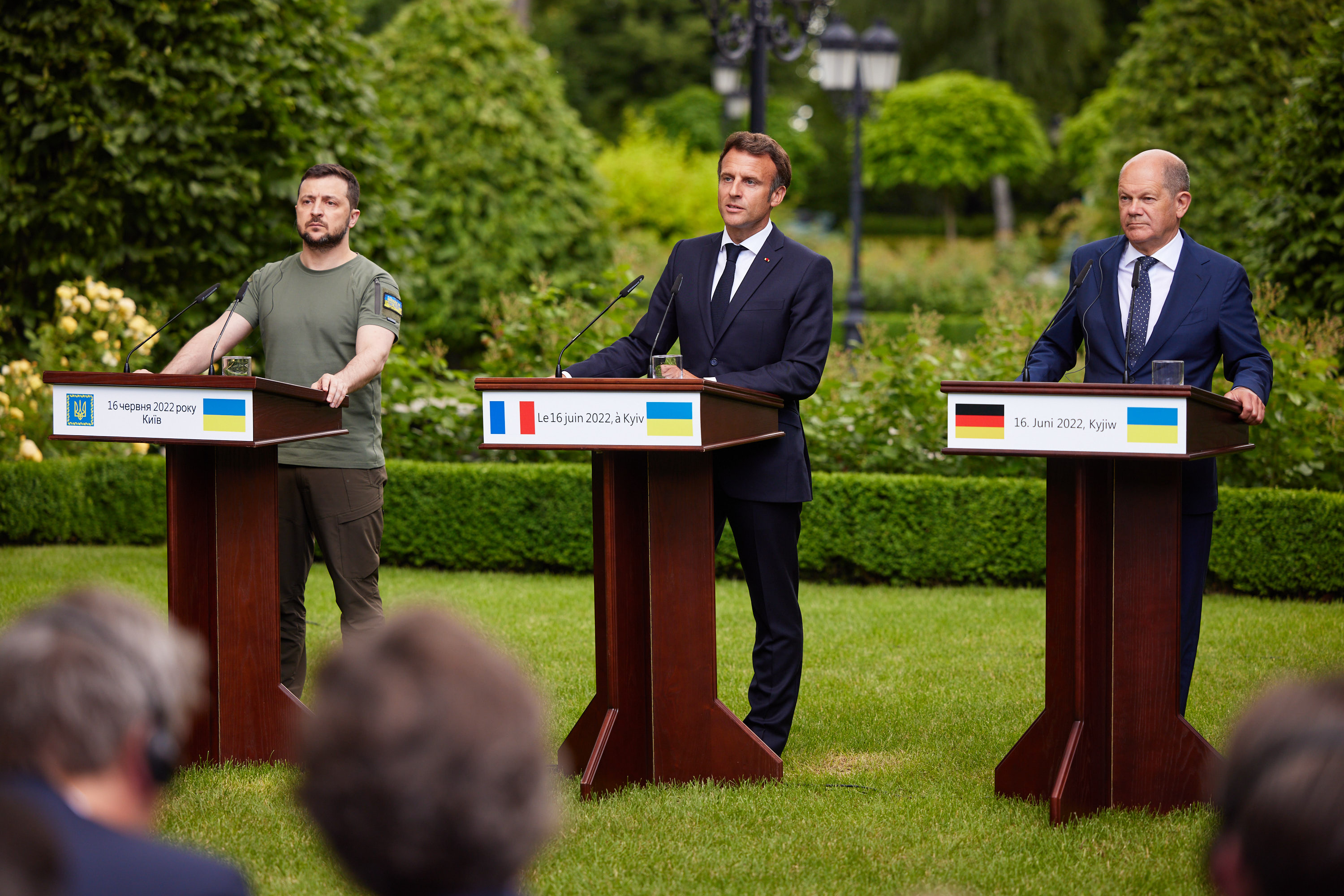
Scholz and Macron visit Kyiv on 16 June 2022

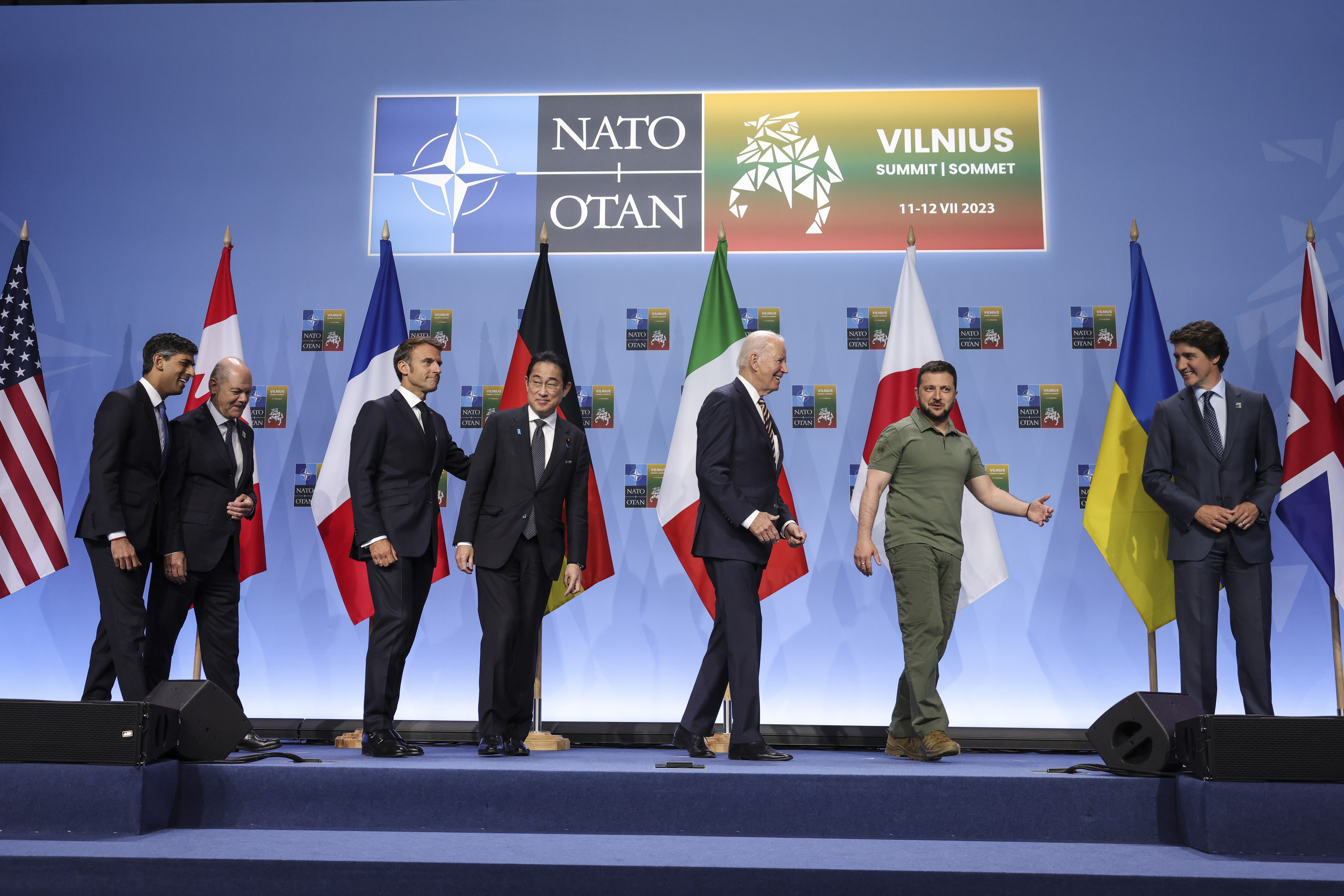
Scholz at the NATO Summit in Vilnius on 12 July 2023

International trips by Olaf Scholz: Germany 1 visit 2 visits 3 to 7 visits 8 to 10 visits 11 and more visits No known visits

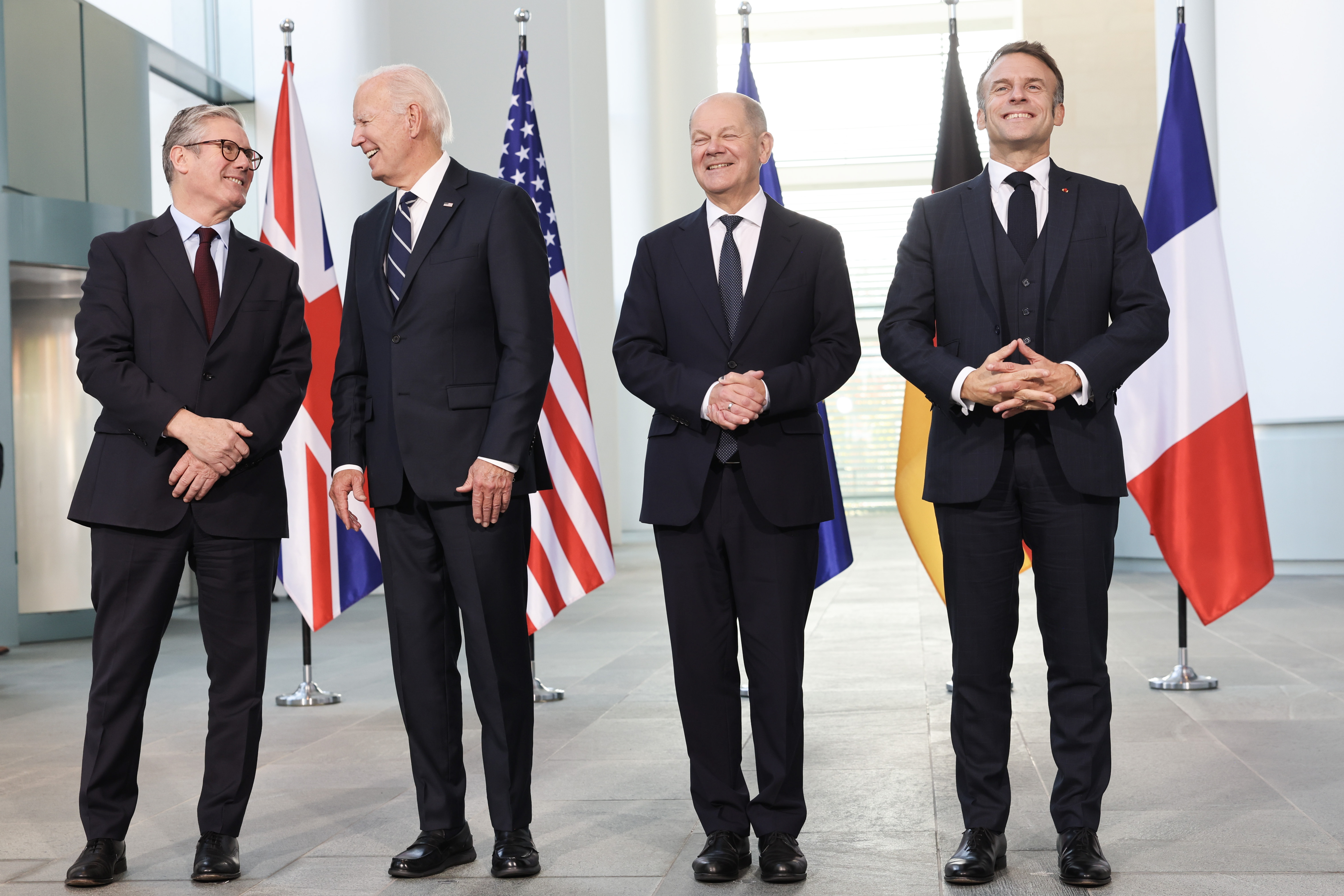
Scholz with Biden, Keir Starmer and Emmanuel Macron on 18 October 2024

In January 2022, The New York Times reported intensifying concerns from the US and other NATO allies about the Scholz government's "evident hesitation to take forceful measures" against Russia in the run-up to its invasion of Ukraine.

The Scholz government initially refused to send weapons to Ukraine, citing existing German policy and financial support for the Eastern European country. As late as 15 February, Scholz was quoted by TASS as saying "the way out of the crisis in Ukraine is to implement the Steinmeier formula", a mechanism of granting a special status to the Donbas. On 26 February, following the 2022 Russian invasion of Ukraine, Scholz reversed his decision and pledged a supply of anti-tank weapons and Stinger missiles to Ukraine.

Before the 24 February 2022 Russian invasion of Ukraine, Scholz rejected Ukraine's demands for weapons deliveries on 6 February, saying Germany "has for many years taken the clear stance that we do not deliver to crisis regions". The Russian invasion drastically changed German policy with regard to defense spending, aiding Ukraine and the nation's energy security.

Scholz greatly increased German defense expenditure. Three days after the invasion started, he announced in the Zeitenwende speech the creation of a one-off €100B fund for the Bundeswehr. This represented a major shift in German foreign policy, as Germany had long refused to meet the required spending of 2% of its GDP on defense, as is required by NATO. In addition to increasing defense spending for his own country, in an address to Germany's parliament on 23 March, Scholz emphasized support for aiding Ukraine in its resistance to Russian invasion.

With regard to supporting Ukraine and taking action against Russia, Scholz was trailing behind others. On 26 February 2022, he was the last of several EU leaders to continue opposition against kicking Russia out of the SWIFT international payment system. However, Germany did send some effective weapons to Ukraine. By 17 March about 2,000 portable missile weapons against tanks and aircraft had been sent. In his 23 March speech, Scholz claimed that Germany would "try everything we can until peace prevails again on our continent" including taking hundreds of thousands of Ukrainian refugees across German borders. Like most other NATO leaders, he declined to impose a no-fly zone, as that would probably draw NATO into a direct military conflict with Russia.

Apart from increasing defense spending and aiding Ukraine, the invasion also highlighted the dangers of relying on Russian gas. By 3 March 2022, Scholz had announced plans to build two new LNG terminals. Economy minister Habeck then visited Norway and on 19 March Qatar, one of the world's largest exporters of liquefied natural gas. Here he signed a long-term agreement about importing Qatari gas. Amid pressure to prohibit Russian gas imports across Europe, Scholz still refused to end German imports of Russian gas in the first days of April. A few days later, he said Germany was working on ending the import of Russian energy. He opposed a reversal of Germany's scheduled end to nuclear power, saying the technical challenges were too great.

In early April 2022 news of the Bucha massacre shocked public opinion in Europe. On 6 April Guy Verhofstadt got a lot of attention with a passionate speech about Ukraine before the European parliament. He ended it by accusing the German government of "dragging its feet" with regard to taking action against Russia. That same month, Germany policy changed and the chancellor avowed that Germany would provide Ukraine with more than €1B to spend on military resources. Scholz rejected a plan made by Vice Chancellor and Economy Minister Robert Habeck and Foreign Minister Annalena Baerbock to deliver 100 Marder Infantry fighting vehicles from German stocks to Ukraine.

From May 2022, the aid to Ukraine became increasingly significant. The rhetoric of the chancellor also began to change. On 9 May 2022, Scholz said that Russians and Ukrainians once fought together during World War II against Nazi Germany's "murderous National Socialist regime", but now "Putin wants to overthrow Ukraine and destroy its culture and identity... [and] even regards his barbaric war of aggression as being on a par with the fight against National Socialism. That is a falsification of history and a disgraceful distortion." On 16 June 2022, Scholz visited the Ukrainian capital Kyiv alongside French president Emmanuel Macron and Italian prime minister Mario Draghi to meet President Volodymyr Zelenskyy. They talked about various issues such as the war in Ukraine and Ukraine's membership into the EU. This comes as a reverse of his previous stance to not visit Ukraine, after Zelenskyy rebuked the German president Frank-Walter Steinmeier over his contribution to stronger Moscow-Berlin ties.

By 1 September 2022, the actual volume of German arms deliveries to Ukraine was only exceeded by that of deliveries by the United States and the United Kingdom. The verdict was that, "based on these statistics, Berlin had ultimately positioned itself as a reliable partner of Ukraine." However, it "could also be argued that Berlin's communication to affirm its Ukraine stance and explain its foreign policy goals had been nothing short of an unmitigated disaster".

In January 2023, Scholz announced the decision to send Leopard 2 battle tanks to Ukraine.

In May 2024, Scholz gave Ukraine permission to strike targets inside Russia with German-supplied weapons.

In July 2024, Russian President Vladimir Putin warned of a Cold War-style missile crisis and threatened to deploy long-range missiles within striking distance of the West after the United States announced its intention to deploy long-range missiles in Germany starting in 2026 that could hit Russian territory within 10 minutes. US weapons in Germany would include SM-6 and Tomahawk cruise missiles and developmental hypersonic weapons. Scholz supported the decision to place US long-range missiles in Germany, but his government's move was criticized by the political opposition as well as within Scholz's coalition. Critics say the move would trigger a new arms race. Biden and Scholz's plan to deploy long-range missiles in Germany has been compared to the deployment of Pershing II launchers in Western Europe in 1979.

In a phone call in November 2024, Scholz urged Putin to withdraw his forces from Ukraine and begin talks aiming at a "just and lasting peace". The call was sharply criticized by Zelenskyy, who considered it as undermining efforts to isolate Putin. Several European officials were said to have cautioned Scholz against the move.

=== Domestic policy ===
On 6 November 2024, Scholz removed Finance Minister Christian Lindner from his position, citing loss of trust. Lindner's removal led to the collapse of the governing coalition. The government crisis was complicated by the fact that the German economy entered its second consecutive year of recession. Germany also faced a severe housing crisis in 2024, leading Scholz to describe housing as Germany's most pressing social issue.

In October 2024, Scholz warned of the deindustrialization of Germany. In December 2024, Scholz criticized Volkswagen's plan to close factories in Germany. He proposed a European subsidy programme for electric vehicles. He also pledged support for the German steel industry, which was facing high energy costs.

In September 2024, pollster Infratest dimap found that Scholz's approval rating was 18%, one of the lowest ever recorded by a German chancellor.

==== COVID-19 vaccine mandate ====
During his campaign in the 2021 election, Scholz opposed a COVID-19 vaccine mandate. Since late November 2021, he has expressed support for mandatory vaccination for adults, scheduled to be voted during the first months of 2022 by the federal parliament, and for the closure of non-essential retail stores to unvaccinated adults, based on the 2G-Regel, decreed by state governments in December 2021.

On 13 January 2022, Scholz told lawmakers in the Bundestag that Germany should make COVID-19 vaccinations mandatory for all adults. Later that month, he warned that the COVID-19 pandemic would not "miraculously" disappear and that compulsory vaccinations were necessary. The opposition Christian Democratic Union criticized the government for not taking a firm decision on a vaccine mandate. The far-right Alternative for Germany party wanted Scholz's government to ban vaccine mandates.

==== Immigration policy ====
In December 2021, Scholz said that Germany was a country of immigration and pledged to reduce barriers to immigration to Germany and make it easier for immigrants to obtain German citizenship. 352,000 people applied for asylum in Germany in 2023, the highest number since 2016, when 722,370 people applied for asylum. People from Ukraine are not included among asylum seekers. Most asylum seekers in 2023 were from Turkey, Syria and Afghanistan. In September 2023, more than 120 boats carrying approximately 7,000 migrants from Africa arrived on the island of Lampedusa within 24 hours. Some of the migrants were relocated to Germany.

In 2023, 1,933,000 people immigrated to Germany, including 276,000 from Ukraine and 126,000 from Turkey, while 1,270,000 people emigrated. Net immigration to Germany was 663,000 in 2023, down from a record 1,462,000 in 2022.

In 2022, Scholz stated that Russian deserters and draft evaders who refused to take part in the Russian invasion of Ukraine should be protected in Germany. However, in 2024, German authorities ordered the deportation of Russian nationals who wanted to avoid mobilization and criticized Putin's government on the grounds that they would not face persecution in Russia. On 11 September 2024, he declared that Germany must remain open to immigration to maintain economic growth, and also said that Germany would offer protection to those who are politically persecuted, telling opposition political parties that the issue is non-negotiable. (Note: The right to seek and to enjoy in other countries asylum from persecution is a human right, as defined in article 14 of the Universal Declaration of Human Rights by the United Nations (UN). Germany became a full member of the UN on 18 September 1973. Furthermore, article 16a of the German constitution states that politically persecuted persons have the right to asylum (Politisch Verfolgte genießen Asylrecht), and as Chancellor of Germany Scholz is sworn to "uphold and defend the constitution" ("das Grundgesetz [...] wahren und verteidigen"), as set out in article 56 of that same constitution.)

In August 2024, in response to a deadly attack in Solingen by a Syrian asylum seeker, Scholz called for stricter immigration measures and expedited deportations. The incident reignited debates over migration policies in Germany ahead of upcoming regional elections.

Scholz supports replacement migration to combat the decline and aging of Germany's population. He said that Germany would have to accept 288,000 foreign workers every year. On 14 September 2024, Scholz and Kenyan President William Ruto signed an agreement that opened the German labour market to up to 250,000 skilled and semi-skilled migrant workers from Kenya. There are concerns about brain drain in Kenya, as professionals such as doctors and nurses could leave for better-paying jobs in Germany. Scholz's government has already signed migration partnerships with several other countries, including Morocco, Uzbekistan and Nigeria. Scholz and Indian Prime Minister Narendra Modi agreed that Germany would accept 90,000 skilled workers from India each year.

==== Rearmament of Germany ====
During negotiations on the next German cabinet, Scholz and the presumptive German Chancellor Friedrich Merz reached an agreement to reform the debt brake by changing sections of the Basic Law to exempt defense spending exceeding 1% of GDP. Scholz also agreed to create a special fund of €500 billion for "investments in infrastructure and for additional investments to achieve climate neutrality by 2045".

In March 2025, German lawmakers approved an amendment to the Basic Law, allowing the German government to implement the most massive rearmament of Germany since World War II. The spending package was approved before the 21st Bundestag was constituted on 25 March 2025, where The Left and AfD would have the ability to block it. A two-thirds majority was required to change the German constitution. The plan was supported by the SPD, CDU, and the Greens.

=== SPD chancellor candidate (2025) ===
In November 2024, various SPD legislators and leading figures – most prominently former party leader Sigmar Gabriel – began publicly calling for defence minister Boris Pistorius to be designated the party's chancellor candidate owing to its and Scholz's poor polling. Polling for ARD showed Pistorius as the most favourably viewed national politician: 60% of voters thought he would be a good chancellor, compared to 42% for Merz and 21% for Scholz. In a video released on 21 November 2024, Pistorius ended what had become two weeks of public debate by disavowing any interest in running for chancellor and expressing his full support for Scholz. Such a protracted and public debate, and party leadership's apparent inability to quickly control or restrain it, was seen as embarrassing and damaging; Jusos president Philipp Türmer directly called out party leaders Saskia Esken and Lars Klingbeil for the "shitshow" at their national congress the following weekend. Nonetheless, Scholz was unanimously renominated as chancellor candidate by the party's executive, a group which includes Pistorius, on 25 November 2024. Scholz's nomination was confirmed at a party congress on 11 January 2025; as is usual for sitting chancellors, the vote was by acclamation rather than secret ballot and he received little opposition.

On 16 December 2024, Scholz lost a vote of confidence in the Bundestag, paving the way for elections to be held on 23 February 2025. Exit polls showed that the SPD fell to third place and fell below 20% for the first time since 1933, while also achieving its worst result in terms of vote share since the 1887 federal election, held in the German Empire. After the first exit polls were published, Scholz announced he would not seek to be part of a government led by Friedrich Merz. As a result, Co-party leader Lars Klingbeil also became parliamentary group leader of the SPD, while Co-party leader Saskia Esken is currently still in this office. Scholz was elected to the 21st Bundestag by winning his constituency through the first vote in the 2025 German federal election. He has said that he intends to take up his mandate.

== Political positions ==
Within the SPD, Scholz is widely viewed as forming part of the moderate wing of the party. Because of his flat enunciation and mechanical-sounding choice of words in press conferences and interviews, Scholz has been nicknamed "the Scholzomat" by some media outlets. In 2013, he said that he found the nickname "very appropriate".

=== Economic and financial policy ===
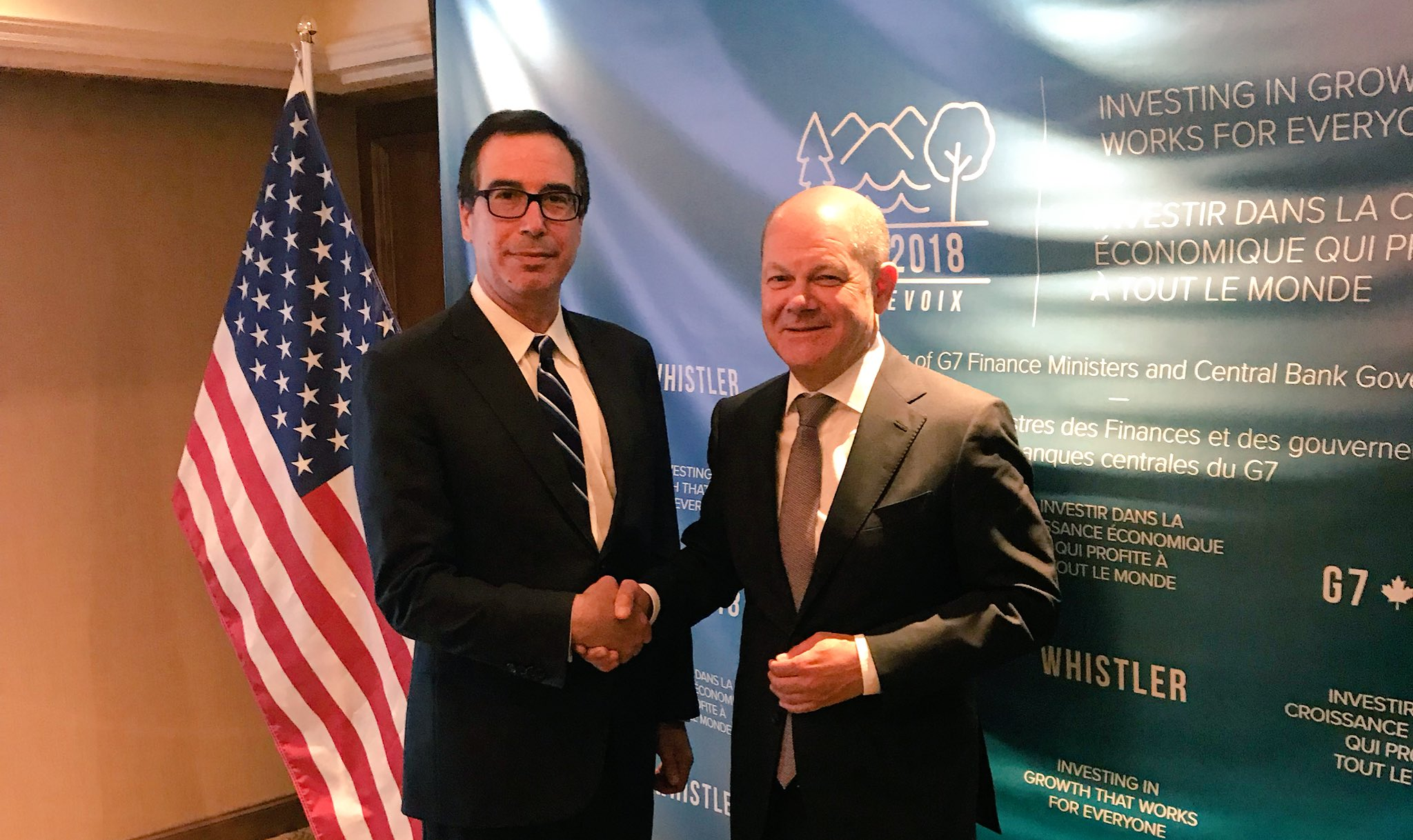
Scholz and US Secretary of the Treasury Mnuchin in 2018

Scholz has been campaigning for a financial transaction tax for several years. Experts have criticized parts of this plan, arguing that it would disproportionately affect small shareholders. In December 2019, Scholz pushed for the introduction of this tax at European Union level. According to a draft legislation, share purchases should be taxed when they involve shares in companies with a market capitalization over €1B. Journalist Hermann-Josef Tenhagen criticized this version of the transaction tax on the basis that it would disproportionately affect lower-income individuals. A report by the Kiel Institute for the World Economy commissioned by the Federal Government in 2020 certified the same deficiencies in the tax concept that Tenhagen had already pointed out.

During his tenure as minister of finance, Scholz prioritized not taking on new government debt and limiting public spending. In 2018, he suggested the creation of an EU-wide unemployment insurance system to make the Eurozone more resilient to future economic shocks.

=== Environment and climate policy ===
In September 2019, Scholz negotiated the climate package in a key role for the SPD. To this, he said: "What we have presented is a great achievement", whereas climate scientists almost unanimously criticized the result as insufficient.

In August 2020, Scholz held a phone call with US Secretary of the Treasury Steven Mnuchin, discussing a lift of US sanctions on the Nord Stream 2 pipeline, one of 23 gas pipelines between Europe and Russia. In exchange, Scholz offered €1B in subsidies to liquid gas terminals in northern Germany for US liquid gas imports. The move sparked controversy with regards to the SPD's stance towards renewable energy.

The revised Climate Protection Act introduced by Olaf Scholz's cabinet as Mayor of Hamburg provides for a 65% reduction in CO_{2} emissions by 2030, an 88% reduction by 2040 and climate neutrality by 2045.

Scholz has advocated for the expansion of renewable energy capacities to replace fossil fuels. In May 2021, Scholz proposed the establishment of an international climate club, which should serve to develop common minimum standards for climate policy measures and a coordinated approach. In addition, uniform rules for the carbon accounting of goods should apply among members.

As part of the coalition agreement that led to Scholz becoming chancellor, the Social Democrats, Free Democrats, and Green party agreed to accelerate Germany's phaseout of coal to the year 2030, in line with the target set by the Powering Past Coal Alliance. The country's previous target had been to end the use of coal by 2038. In addition, the agreement set a phaseout of power generation from natural gas by 2040. The agreement also included provisions for the prohibition on natural gas heating in new buildings and the replacement of natural gas systems in existing buildings. An end to the sale of combustion vehicles would come in 2035, in line with the target set by the European Commission.

=== Foreign policy ===
In January 2019, Scholz stated that he sees China primarily as an economic partner. He tried to persuade Chinese Vice Premier Liu He that China should be more open to German firms, and he supported the Comprehensive Agreement on Investment between the EU and China. In September 2022, he condemned the treatment of ethnic Uyghurs in China's Xinjiang.

In December 2019, Scholz criticized US sanctions on Russia's Nord Stream 2 gas pipeline to Germany, saying: "Such sanctions are a serious interference in the internal affairs of Germany and Europe and their sovereignty." Scholz has expressed support for a longstanding agreement that allows American tactical nuclear weapons to be stored and maintained on American bases within Germany.

In October 2019, Scholz condemned the Turkish invasion of the Kurdish-controlled northeastern areas of Syria, otherwise known as Rojava.

In December 2024, Scholz welcomed the fall of the Assad regime in Syria, describing the situation as "good news".

== Other activities ==
=== International organizations ===
- European Bank for Reconstruction and Development (EBRD), ex officio member of the board of governors (2018–2021)
- European Investment Bank (EIB), ex officio member of the board of governors (2018–2021)
- European Stability Mechanism, member of the board of governors (2018–2021)
- Asian Infrastructure Investment Bank (AIIB), ex officio member of the board of governors (2018–2021)
- International Monetary Fund (IMF), ex officio alternate member of the board of governors (2018–2021)

=== Corporate boards ===
- KfW, ex-officio member of the Board of Supervisory Directors (2018–2021)
- RAG-Stiftung, ex-officio member of the board of trustees (2018–2021)
- HafenCity Hamburg GmbH, ex officio chairman of the supervisory board (−2018)

=== Non-profits ===
- Lebendige Stadt Foundation, member of the board of trustees (2009–2021)
- Deutsche Nationalstiftung, member of the Senate
- Friedrich Ebert Foundation (FES), member
- German Council on Foreign Relations (DGAP), chairman of the Task Force on International Aviation Policy

== Personal life ==
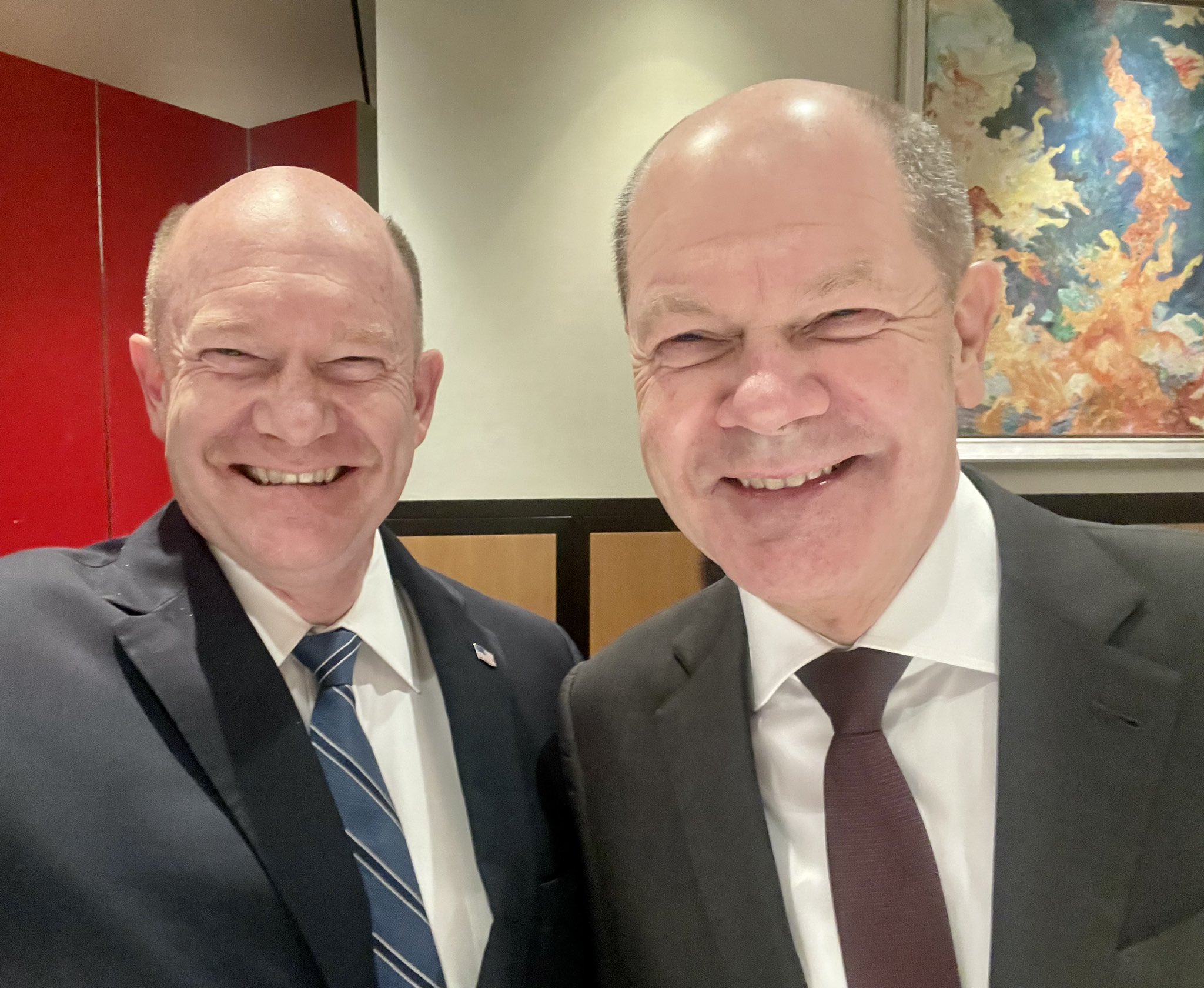
Scholz in a selfie with Chris Coons (left), 2024

Olaf Scholz is married to fellow SPD politician Britta Ernst. The couple lived in Hamburg's Altona district before moving to Potsdam in 2018.

Scholz was raised in the Protestant Church in Germany but later left it. At his inauguration as chancellor in 2021, he took the oath of office without a reference to God (the second chancellor to do so after Gerhard Schröder). He is the first chancellor of the Federal Republic of Germany who is not a member of a church.

Scholz bears a striking resemblance to Chris Coons, an American politician who serves as a U.S. Senator from Delaware, which the two referenced when posing for a selfie together in February 2024 with the caption "Wer ist wer" (German for "who is who").

In September 2023, Scholz was seen wearing an eye patch in a Twitter post following a jogging accident in his hometown. He said the injury "looks worse than it is". Becoming known as the Scholz eye patch, this visual accessory would go on to positively influence his public reputation in Germany.

== See also ==
- Senate Scholz I
- Senate Scholz II

== Notes ==
Party political offices
Preceded by Franz Müntefering	General Secretary of the Social Democratic Party; 2002–2004	Succeeded by Klaus Uwe Benneter
Preceded by Frank-Walter Steinmeier	Deputy Leader of the Social Democratic Party; 2009–2019	Succeeded by Hubertus Heil
Political offices
Preceded by Hartmuth Wrocklage	Senator for the Interior of Hamburg; 2001	Succeeded by Ronald Schill
Preceded by Franz Müntefering	Minister of Labour and Social Affairs; 2007–2009	Succeeded by Franz Josef Jung
Preceded by Christoph Ahlhaus	First Mayor of Hamburg; 2011–2018	Succeeded by Peter Tschentscher
Preceded by Sigmar Gabriel	Vice-Chancellor of Germany; 2018–2021	Succeeded by Robert Habeck
Preceded by Wolfgang Schäuble	Minister of Finance; 2018–2021	Succeeded by Christian Lindner
Preceded by Angela Merkel	Chancellor of Germany; 2021–2025	Succeeded by Friedrich Merz
Diplomatic posts
Preceded by Boris Johnson	Chair of the Group of Seven; 2022	Succeeded by Fumio Kishida
