= Binasal occlusion =

Visual therapy

Binasal occlusion is a method of partial covering (occlusion) of the visual field of the two eyes in which the sector of the visual field that is adjacent to the nose (the nasal visual field) is occluded for each eye. It is a well-known procedure in vision therapy.

By blocking parts of the image that would be seen by both eyes, binocular occlusion reduces the visual stress that would be related diplopia and binocular rivalry. In contrast to an eye patch that occludes the whole visual field of one eye, binocular occlusion allows some degree of binocular vision; more particularly, it emphasizes the role of binocular functioning in peripheral vision: objects that are located to the right can only be fixated by the right eye, and those located to the left only by the left eye. This in particular prevents the cross-fixation.

Binasal occlusion is used in treatment of patients with sensory deficits due to complications of traumatic brain injury or having had a stroke, as well as patients with diplopia, esotropia, convergence excess, divergence insufficiency, or visual overstimulation.

According to a 2017 paper, another hypothesis of the effectiveness of binasal occlusion in the treatment of Post Trauma Vision Syndrome, is the tape provides a stationary reference point that the brain can use to help decode the incoming visual information. The term Visual Motion Sensitivity is coined in this paper.
