= Dental board =

Group of elected or appointed officials regulating dental practices in a given area

A dental board is a group of elected or appointed officials from a given state, province or country that meet to ensure public safety in the application of dental care. The scope of function may include review of current rules and regulations, adopting new regulations with the advent of new services, disciplinary action to the dental professionals, and public education.

In America, dental boards are sometimes named different things in different states, such as Board of Dental Examiners, Dental Bureau, State Dental Commission, Board of Dentistry, Board of Dental Health Care, and so forth.

A dental board may also be referred to as a professional order (in Quebec), a health college (in Ontario), or a self-regulatory body.

Group may consist of dentists, specialist, auxiliary personnel as well as a “lay” member.
