= Port of Hamburg =

Port in Germany

Port of Hamburg Hafen Hamburg
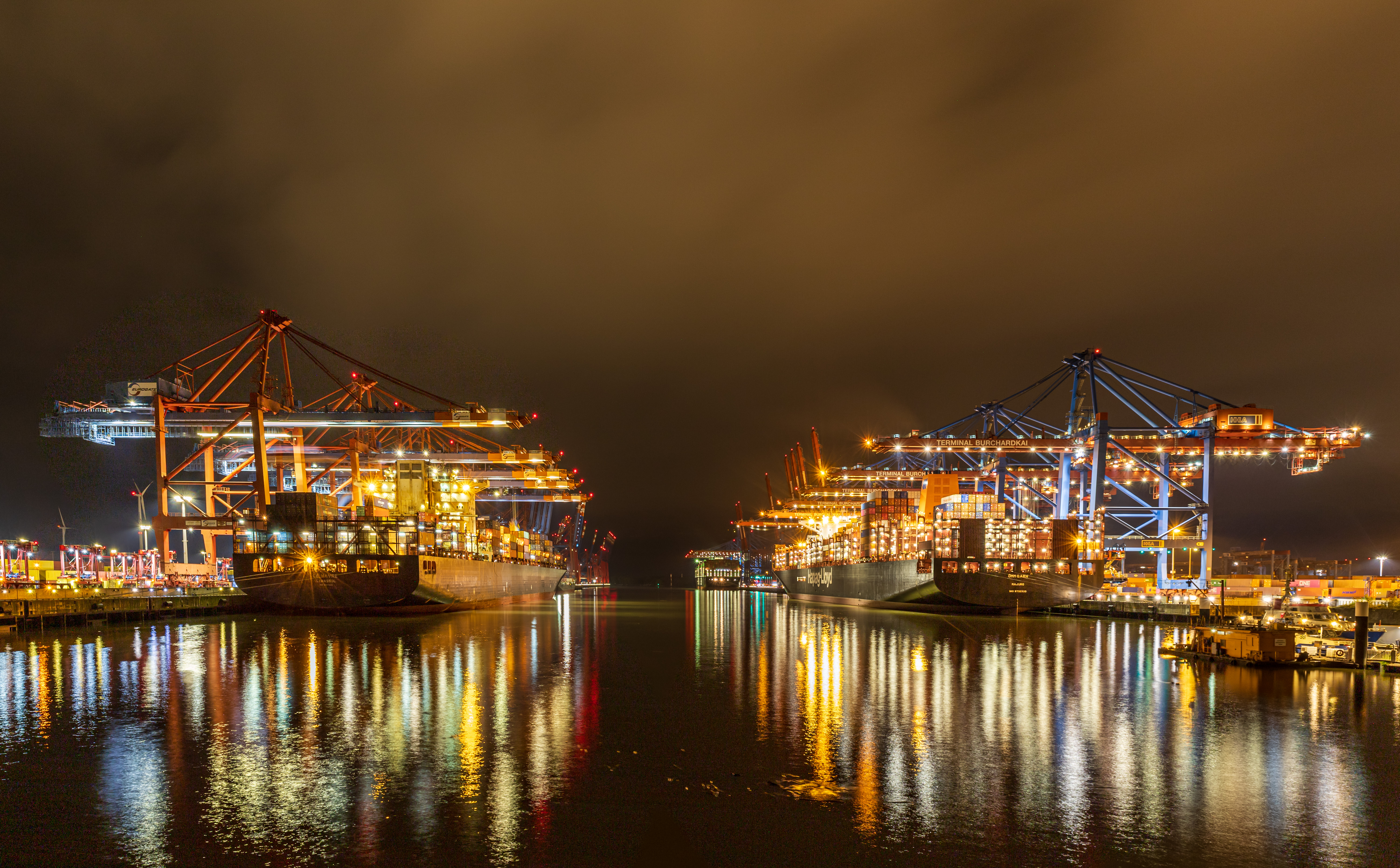
- Container terminal Burchardkai in 2021
- Interactive map of Port of Hamburg; Hafen Hamburg

Location
- Country: Germany
- Location: Hamburg

Details
- Opened: 7 May 1189 by Frederick I
- Operated by: Hamburg Port Authority; Hamburg Hafen und Logistik AG (HHLA)
- Owned by: Hamburg Port Authority
- Type of Harbor: open tidal port
- Land area: 43.31 km^{2} (16.72 sq mi)
- Size: 73.99 km^{2} (28.57 sq mi)
- No. of wharfs: l
- Employees: 10,000 (2004)

Statistics
- Vessel arrivals: ▲9,681 (2013)
- Annual cargo tonnage: ▲145.7 million tonnes (2014)
- Annual container volume: ▲9.73 million TEU (2014)
- Passenger traffic: ▲589,000 passengers (2014)
- Annual revenue: ▲€1.29 billion (2018)
- Main trades: basic pharmaceutical materials, coffee, spice, carpets, paper
- Website

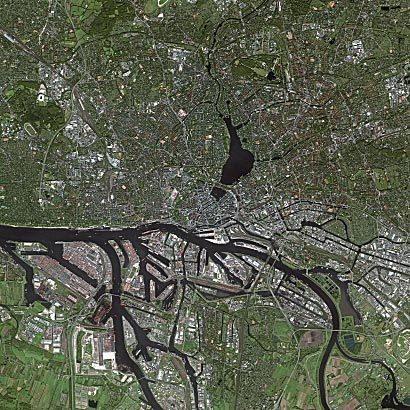
Satellite image of Hamburg. The Port of Hamburg stretches along the Southern shore of the River Elbe which branches into numerous natural river arms.

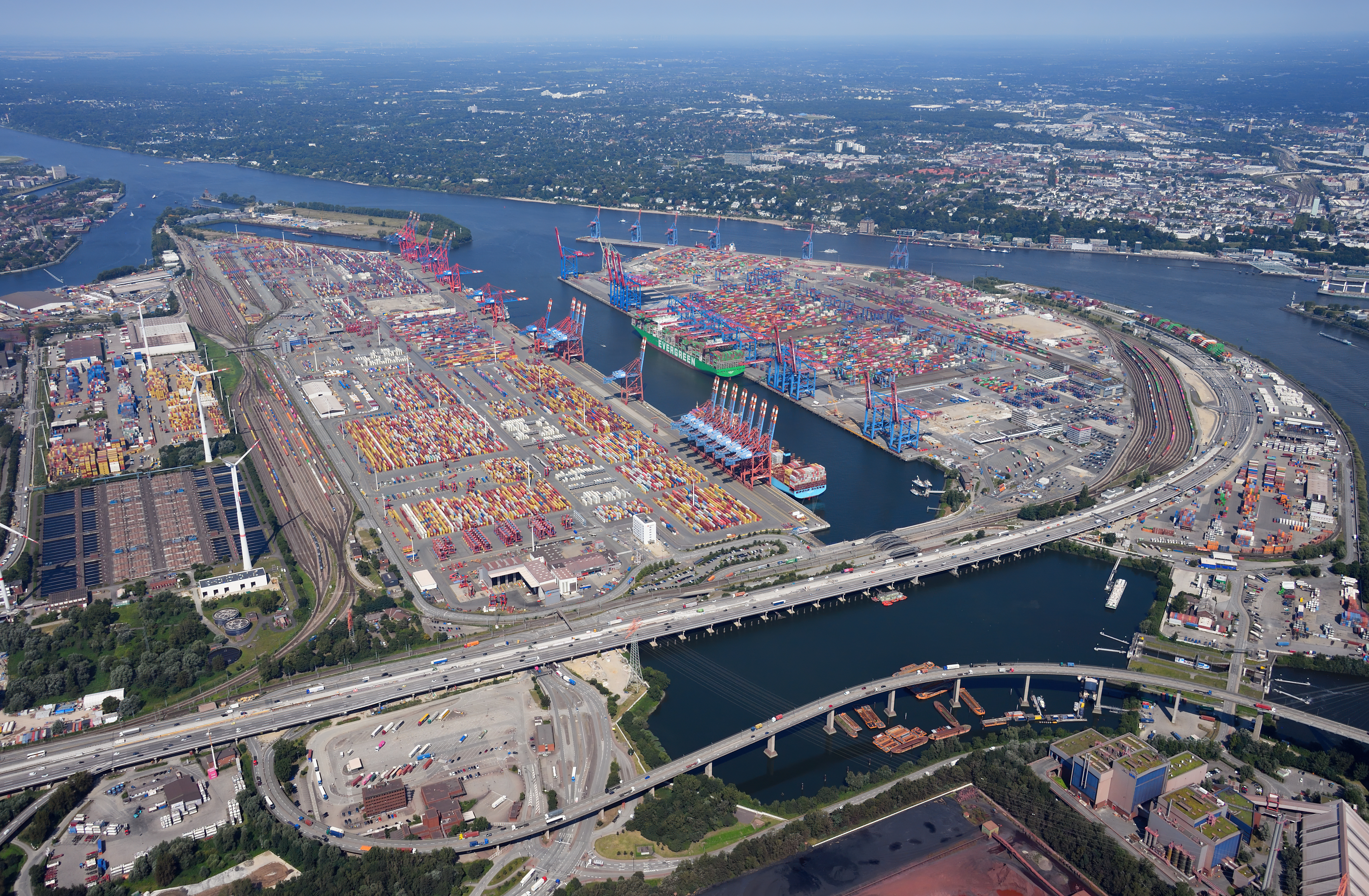
Container Terminals Eurogate (left) and Burchardkai (right)

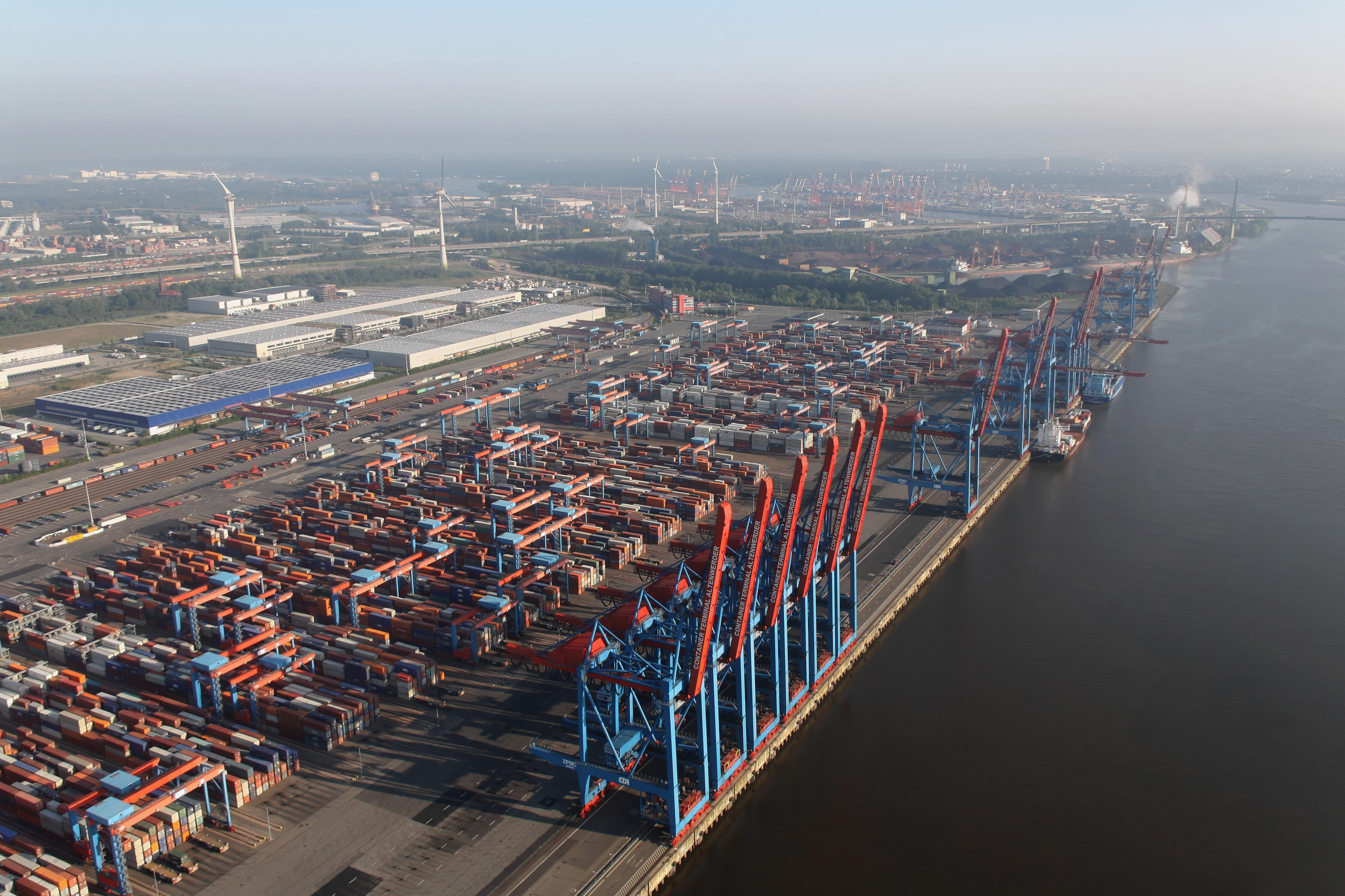
Container Terminal Altenwerder

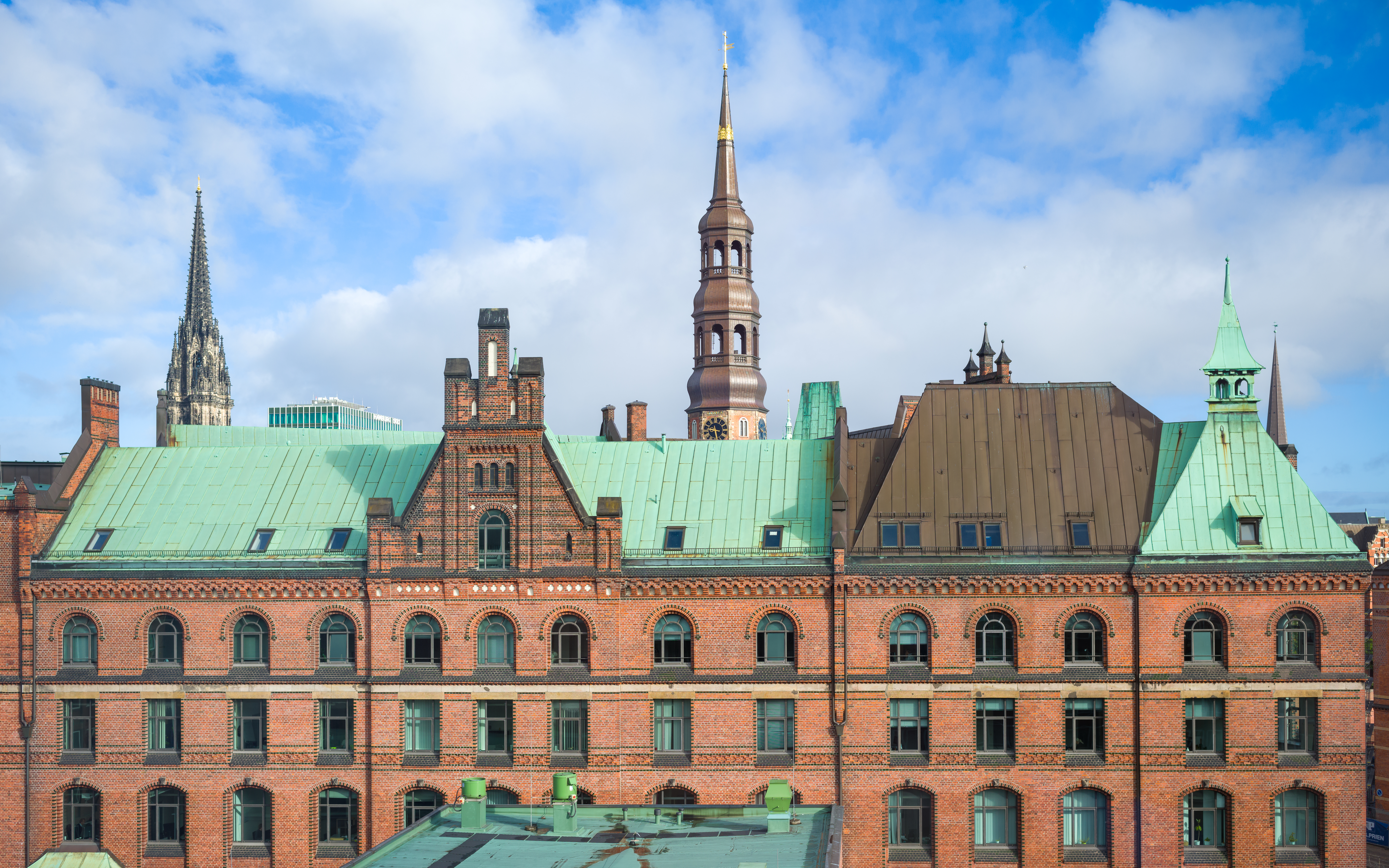
View of historic Speicherstadt warehouses in 2022

The Port of Hamburg (German: Hamburger Hafen, pronounced [ˈhambʊʁɡɐ ˈhaːfn̩]) is a seaport on the river Elbe in Hamburg, Germany, 110 kilometres (68 mi; 59 nmi) from its mouth on the North Sea.

Known as Germany's "Gateway to the World" (Tor zur Welt), it is the country's largest seaport by volume. In terms of TEU throughput, Hamburg is the third-busiest port in Europe (after Rotterdam and Antwerp) and 27th-largest worldwide in 2025. In 2024 7.8 million TEUs (20-foot standard container equivalents), down from 9.73 million TEUs in 2014 were handled in Hamburg.

The port covers an area of 73.99 square kilometres (28.57 sq mi) (64.80 km^{2} usable), of which 43.31 km^{2} (34.12 km^{2}) are land areas. The branching Elbe creates an ideal place for a port complex with warehousing and transshipment facilities. The extensive free port was established when Hamburg joined the German Customs Union. It enabled duty-free storing of imported goods and also importing of materials which were processed, re-packaged, used in manufacturing and then re-exported without incurring customs duties. The free port was abandoned in 2013.

== History ==
The port is almost as old as the history of Hamburg itself. Founded on 7 May 1189 by Frederick I at a strategic location near the mouth of the Elbe, it has been Central Europe's main port for centuries and enabled Hamburg to develop early into a leading city of trade with a rich and proud bourgeoisie.

During the age of the Hanseatic League from the 13th to 16th century, Hamburg was considered second only to the port and city of Lübeck in terms of its position as a central trading node for sea-borne trade. With discovery of the Americas and the emerging transatlantic trade, Hamburg exceeded all other German ports. During the second half of the 19th century, Hamburg became Central Europe's main hub for transatlantic passenger and freight travel, and from 1871 onward it was Germany's principal port of trade. In her time the Hamburg America Line was the largest shipping company in the world. Since 1888, the HADAG runs a scheduled ferry service across various parts of the port and the Elbe. The Free Port (Freihafen), established on 15 October 1888, enabled traders to ship and store goods without going through customs and further enhanced Hamburg's position in sea trade with neighbouring countries. It was permanently closed on 1 January 2013. The Moldauhafen has a similar arrangement, though related to the Czech Republic exclusively.

The Speicherstadt, one of Hamburg's architectural icons today, is a large wharf area of 350,000 m^{2} floor area on the northern shore of the river, built in the 1880s as part of the free port and to cope with the growing quantity of goods stored in the port.

Hamburg shipyards lost fleets twice after World War I and World War II. Moreover, during World War II, Hamburg harbour was the hub destination of the Hamburg America Line, that assured the Nazi Party a connection to the United States for the import of oil and steel, and the export of manufactured goods from Germany thanks to container ships. The shipping line Hamburg-Amerikanische Packetfahrt-Aktien-Gesellschaft (HAPAG) gave the name to the so-called shipping company based in Hamburg which used to run the trades of goods on this route. In 1970, along with Norddeutscher Lloyd, the present-day active company Hapag-Lloyd was founded.

During the partition of Germany between 1945 and 1990, the Port of Hamburg lost much of its hinterland and consequently many of its trading connections. However, since German reunification, the fall of the Iron Curtain and European enlargement, Hamburg has made substantial ground as one of Europe's prime logistics centres and as one of the world's largest and busiest sea ports.

In 2022, the German government let the Chinese state-owned COSCO Shipping take a stake in ownership of the port.

== Access ==
Deepening of the river Elbe for large vessels is controversial for ecological reasons. In part due to cooperation with Lower Saxony and Bremen to build a new container port (JadeWeserPort) in the deep waters of Jadebusen in Wilhelmshaven, Hamburg withdrew from this plan after a change of government in 2001.

== Hamburg Port Authority ==
The port is administered by the Hamburg Port Authority. The Hamburg Port Authority is described as having adopted an innovative approach. In November 2016 the Hamburg Port Authority ordered a modern fireboat budgeted at 16 million euros.

== Terminals ==
Port	Operator	Type	Berths	Quay length	Quay cranes	Area (Ha)	Capacity (kTEU)
EUROGATE Container Terminal Hamburg (CTH)	Eurogate	Containers	6	2,050 m	21	140	2,900
Container Terminal Altenwerder (CTA)	HHLA	Containers	4	1,400 m	26	110	> 3,000
Container Terminal Burchardkai (CTB)	HHLA	Containers	10	2,850 m	22	140	5,200
Container Terminal Tollerort (CTT)	HHLA	Containers	4	1,240 m	12	40	950
Buss Hansa Terminal		Multi-Purpose		840 m	9	30	
Buss Ross Terminal		Multi-Purpose		230 m	1		
Rhenus Midgard Hamburg	Rhenus Midgard Hamburg GmbH	Multi-Purpose	3	500 m	2		
G.T.H. Getreide Terminal Hamburg	Getreide AG	bulk cargo	1	270 m			
Kalikai	K+S Transport GmbH	bulk cargo					
Louis Hagel	Louis Hagel GmbH & Co. KG	bulk cargo	2	300 m	1		
Steinweg		bulk cargo		1,150 m	4		250
Buss Hansa Terminal		liquid cargo		840 m			
Elbe Mineralölwerke	Royal Dutch Shell	liquid cargo					8/ship
Vopak Terminal Hamburg	Vopak	liquid cargo		840 m	9	720,000 cbm	5,000
Hamburg Cruise Center Altona		Passenger	1	326 m			
Hamburg Cruise Center HafenCity		Passenger	2	345 m			
Hamburg Cruise Center Steinwerder		Passenger	1	330 m			

== Cruise ==
Hamburg is a major cruise destination and one of Europe's largest ports of call for cruise passengers traveling the Atlantic, or the Norwegian and Baltic Seas. The port is also a major location for shipbuilder and shipyards, designing, building and reconditioning yachts and cruise liners. Hamburg has three passenger terminals for cruise ships: Hamburg Cruise Center HafenCity, the Hamburg Cruise Center Altona and the Hamburg Cruise Center Steinwerder, all three capable of processing the world's largest cruise ships.

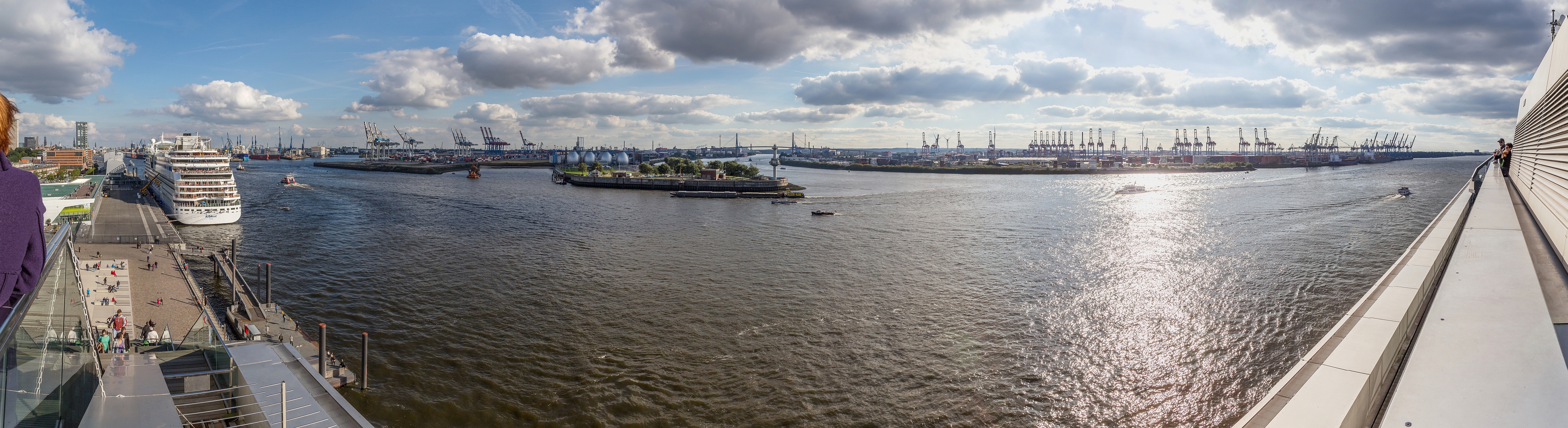
Panoramic view of the Port of Hamburg as seen from atop Dockland Hamburg

== Culture ==
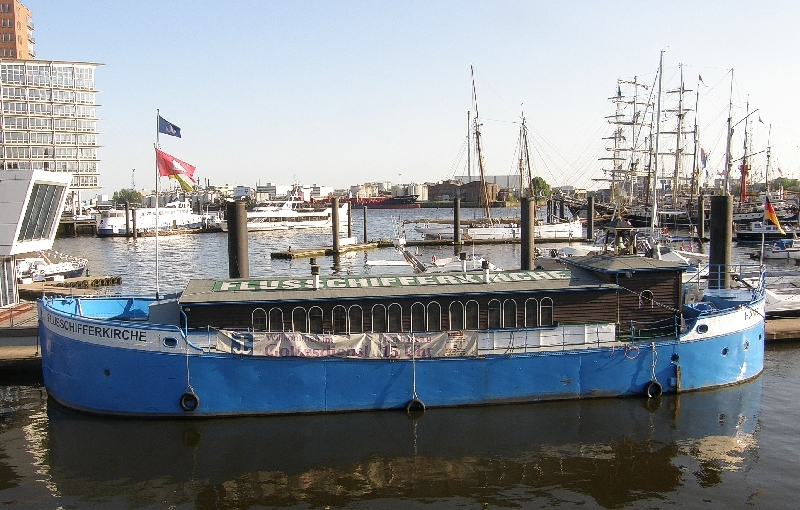
Flussschifferkirche (Boatman's Church)

Hamburg's harbour is also one of the city's major attractions, both as a vital, industrial, and logistical centre, and as a backdrop for modern culture and harbour history. These include several museum ships, musical theatres, bars, restaurants, and hotels – and even a floating church.

The annual celebration of the port's birthday (Hafengeburtstag), during the first weekend of May, is one of Hamburg's biggest public events. National and international visitors come to experience the festivities. Tugboats perform "ballets", old galleons and new cruise ships are open for tours, and fireworks explode at night.

Tour guides on boat tours in the port are called "he lüchts" (Low German for "he is lying"), after an often used call of dock workers when they overheard the stories told to tourists.

== See also ==
- BallinStadt
- Elbe 17
