= Hermann Blohm =

German shipbuilder and company founder

- Born: 23 June 1848; Lübeck
- Died: 12 March 1930 (aged 81)

Adolph Hermann Blohm (23 June 1848 – 12 March 1930) was a German shipbuilder and company founder of Blohm+Voss.

== Life ==
Blohm was born in Lübeck to merchant Georg Blohm. He studied at ETH Zurich in Switzerland. Together with Ernst Voss he founded on 5 April 1877 the German company Blohm & Voss as a general partnership, to build steel-hulled ships. They established a shipyard on the island of Kuhwerder, near the Free and Hanseatic City of Hamburg.

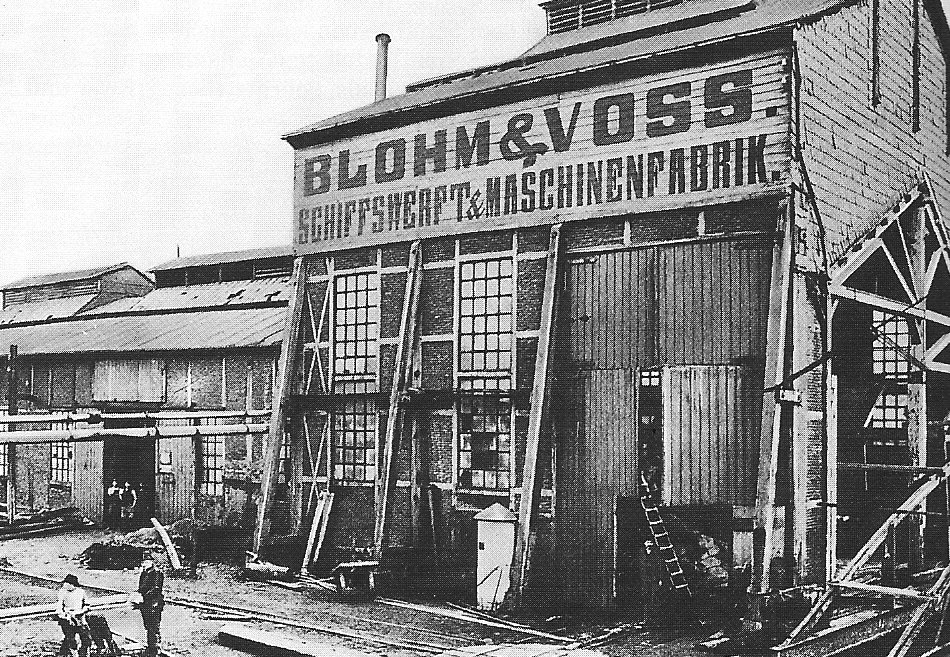
Pincerno - Blohm & Voss 1877

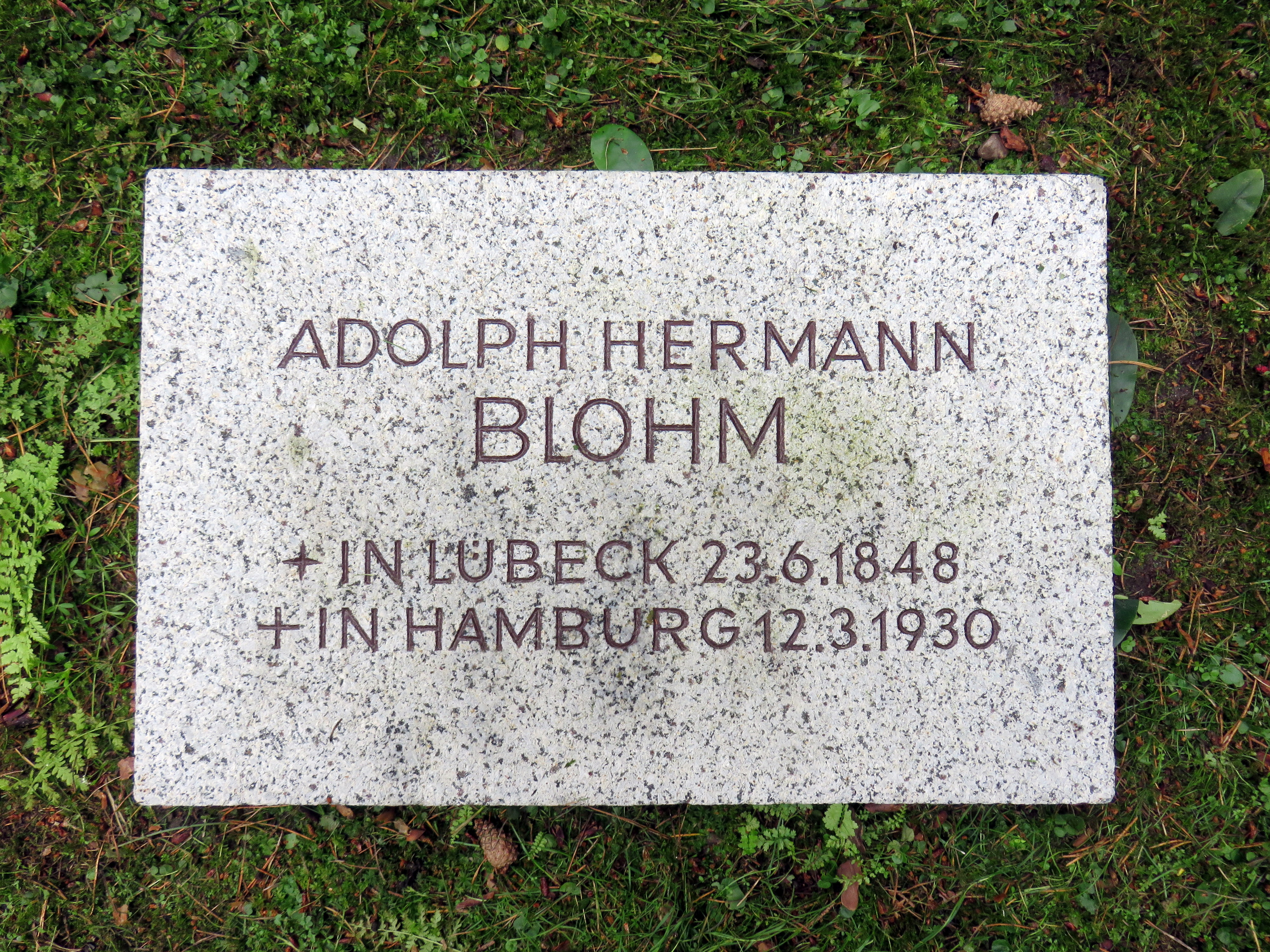
Graveyard of Hermann Blohm at Ohlsdorf Cemetery

On 29 December 1884, he became a founding member of the German organisation Verband für Schiffbau und Meerestechnik in Hamburg. Blohm was married to Emmi Alwine Westphal. His sons Rudolf and Walther worked in the company Blohm+Voss. He died in Hamburg.

== Awards ==
- 1907: Grashof-Denkmünze

== Literature ==
- Erich Gercken: Die Lübecker Familie Blohm. In: Der Wagen 1964, p. 123–131.
- Sibylle Küttner: Blohm, Hermann. In: Hamburgische Biografie. Band 3, Wallstein, Göttingen 2006, ISBN 3-8353-0081-4, p. 45–47.
- Christian Ostersehlte: Blohm, Hermann, in: Biographisches Lexikon für Schleswig-Holstein und Lübeck, edition 11, Neumünster 2000, p. 40–43 ISBN 3-529-02640-2, corrected ISBN 3-529-02640-9.
- Hans Joachim Schröder: Hermann Blohm. Gründer der Werft Blohm & Voss, Hamburg 2011 (Mäzene für Wissenschaft, edition 10), ISBN 978-3-937816-85-2.
- Friedrich-Christian Stahl: Blohm, Adolph Hermann. in: Neue Deutsche Biographie (NDB). edition 2, Duncker & Humblot, Berlin 1955, ISBN 3-428-00183-4, p. 312 f.
