= Ernst Voss =

German entrepreneur and engineer

Ernst Voss (January 12, 1842 in Fockbek – August 1, 1920 in Hamburg) was a German shipbuilder and co-company founder of German company Blohm+Voss.

== Life ==
Since 1863 Voss studied in Zürich, Switzerland engineering. After his university studies he worked in England for company Gwynne und R.Elder & Co. Together with Hermann Blohm he founded on 5 April 1877 German company Blohm & Voss as a general partnership, to build steel-hulled ships. They established a shipyard on the island of Kuhwerder, near the Free and Hanseatic City of Hamburg.

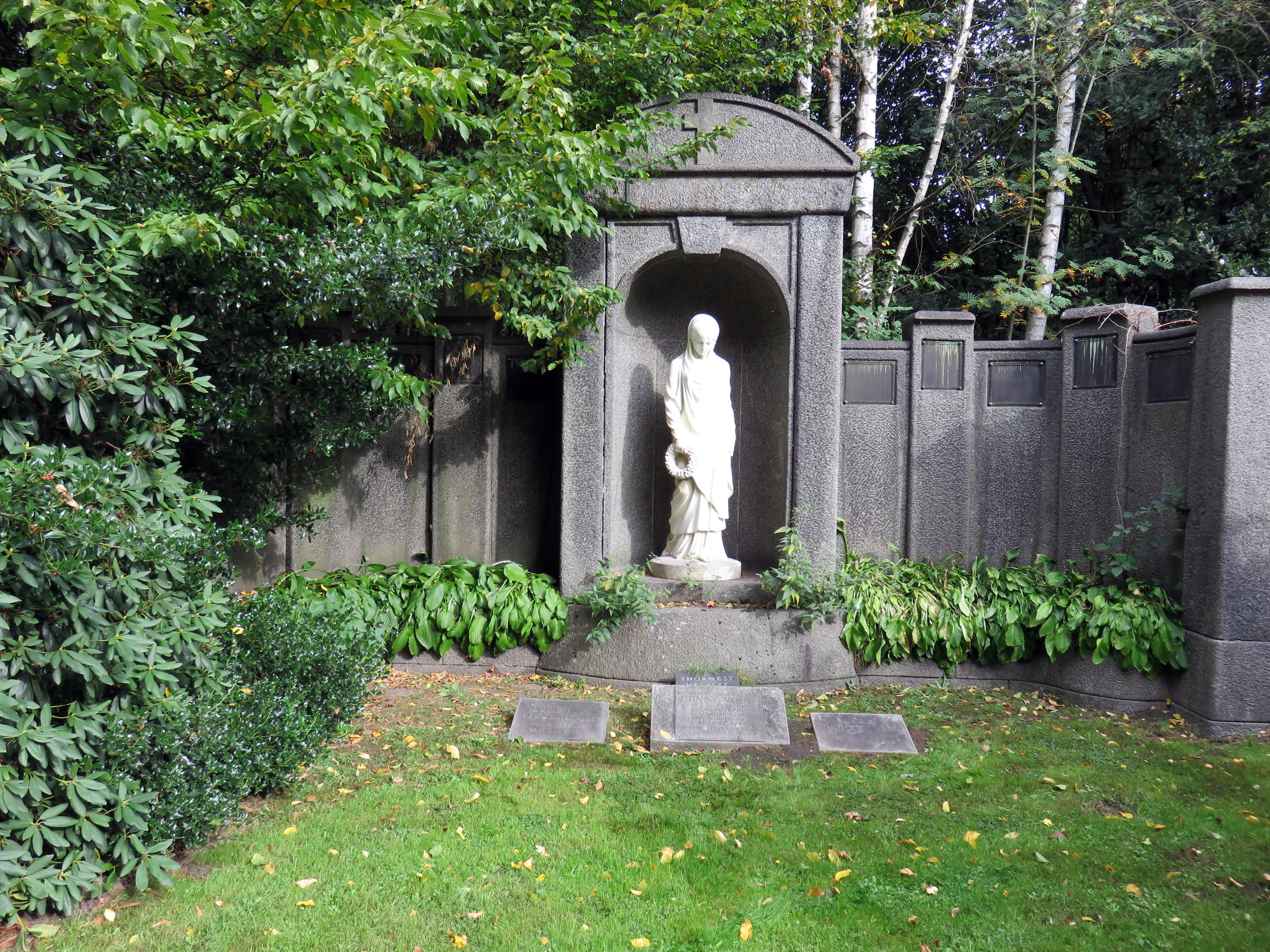
Graveyard of Ernst Voss
