= He lücht =

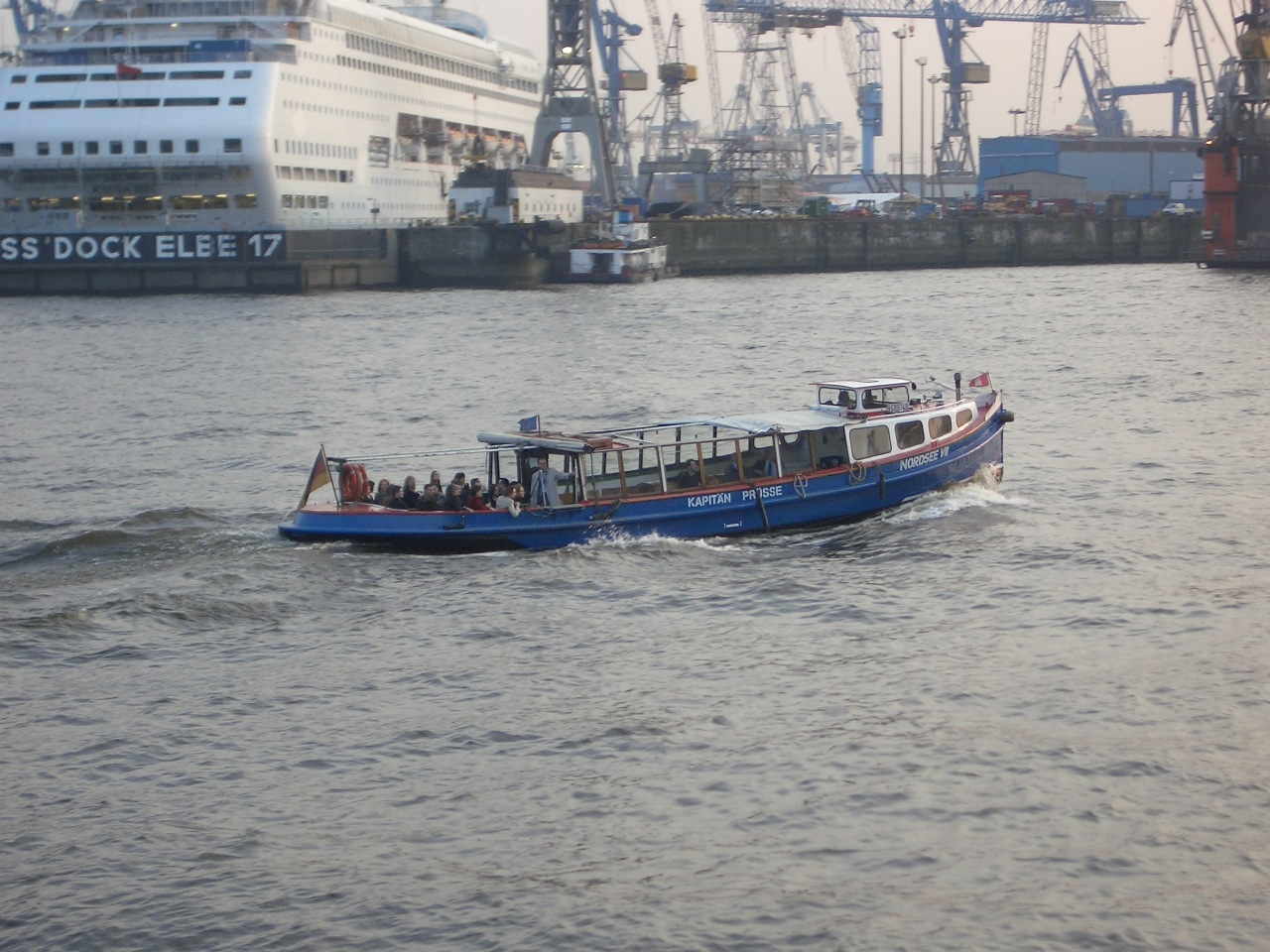
Small Boat (Barkasse) used for tourist tours in Hamburg.

He lücht (low German he is lying) is an expression used in Hamburg, Germany, for tour guides in the port of Hamburg.

== Overview ==
The first HADAG harbour tours started in 1921. The tour guides often told anecdotes and stories. When the boats came close to workers in the harbour, they would denounce the tour guides by saying "he lücht" (he lies).

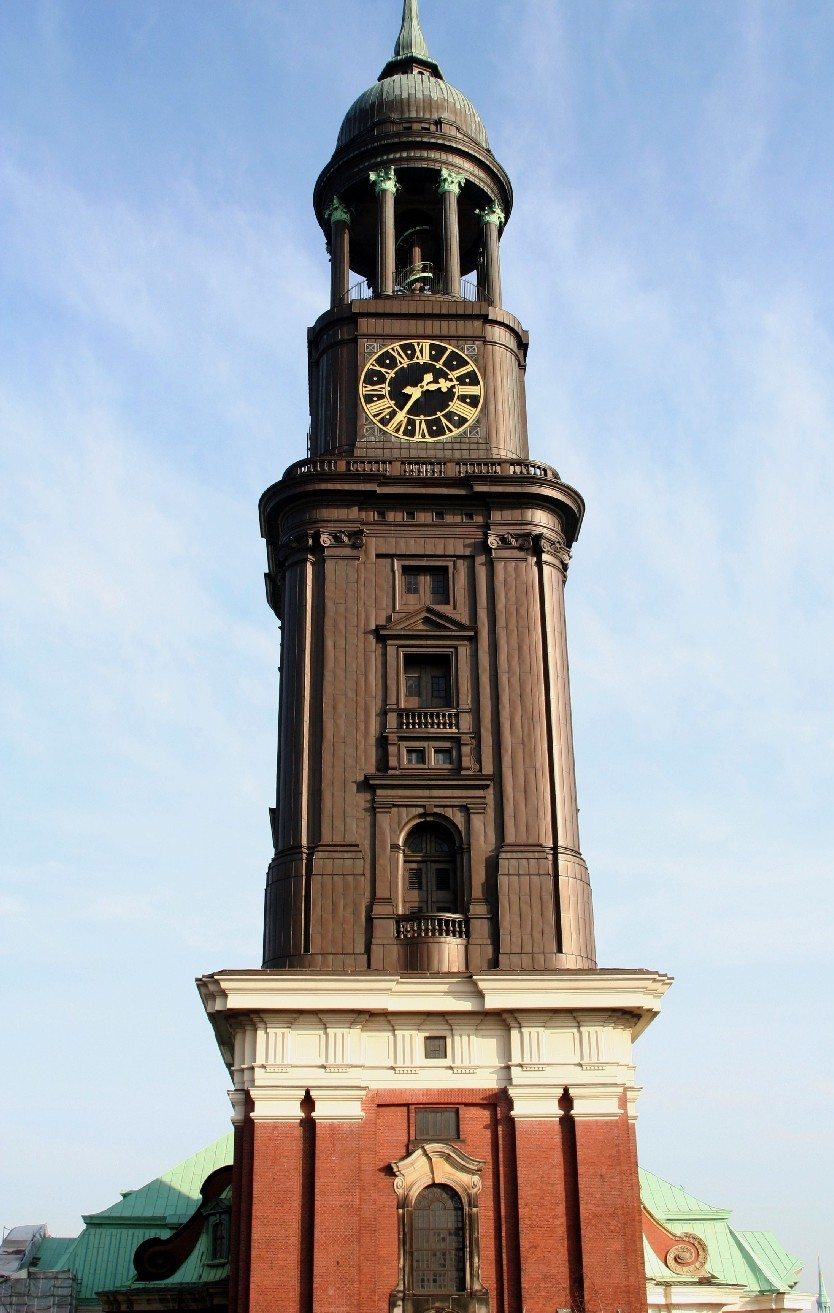
"The tower of Sankt Michaelis (Hamburg) allows one to see three seas: The sea of houses during day, the sea of lights during the night and the see nothing on foggy days.

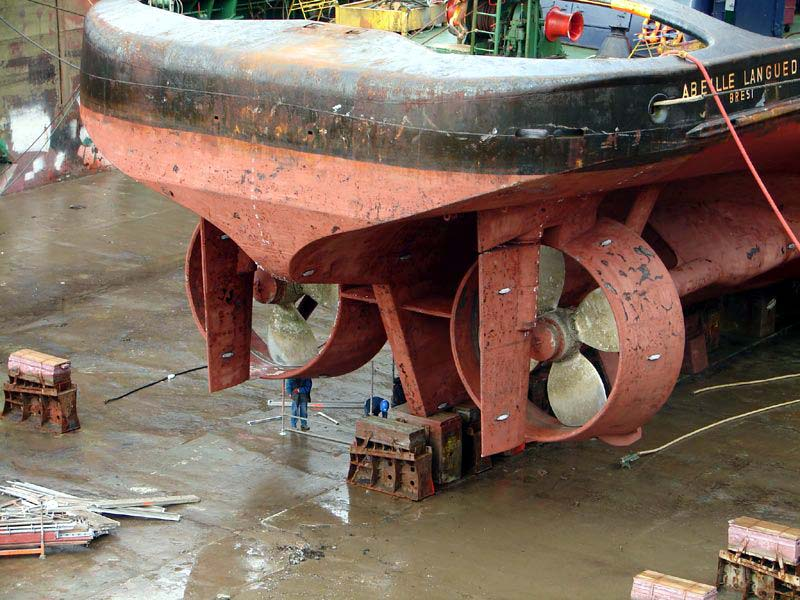
"As everyone knows, double propeller ships have one propeller to travel to, and another to travel back from a destination."

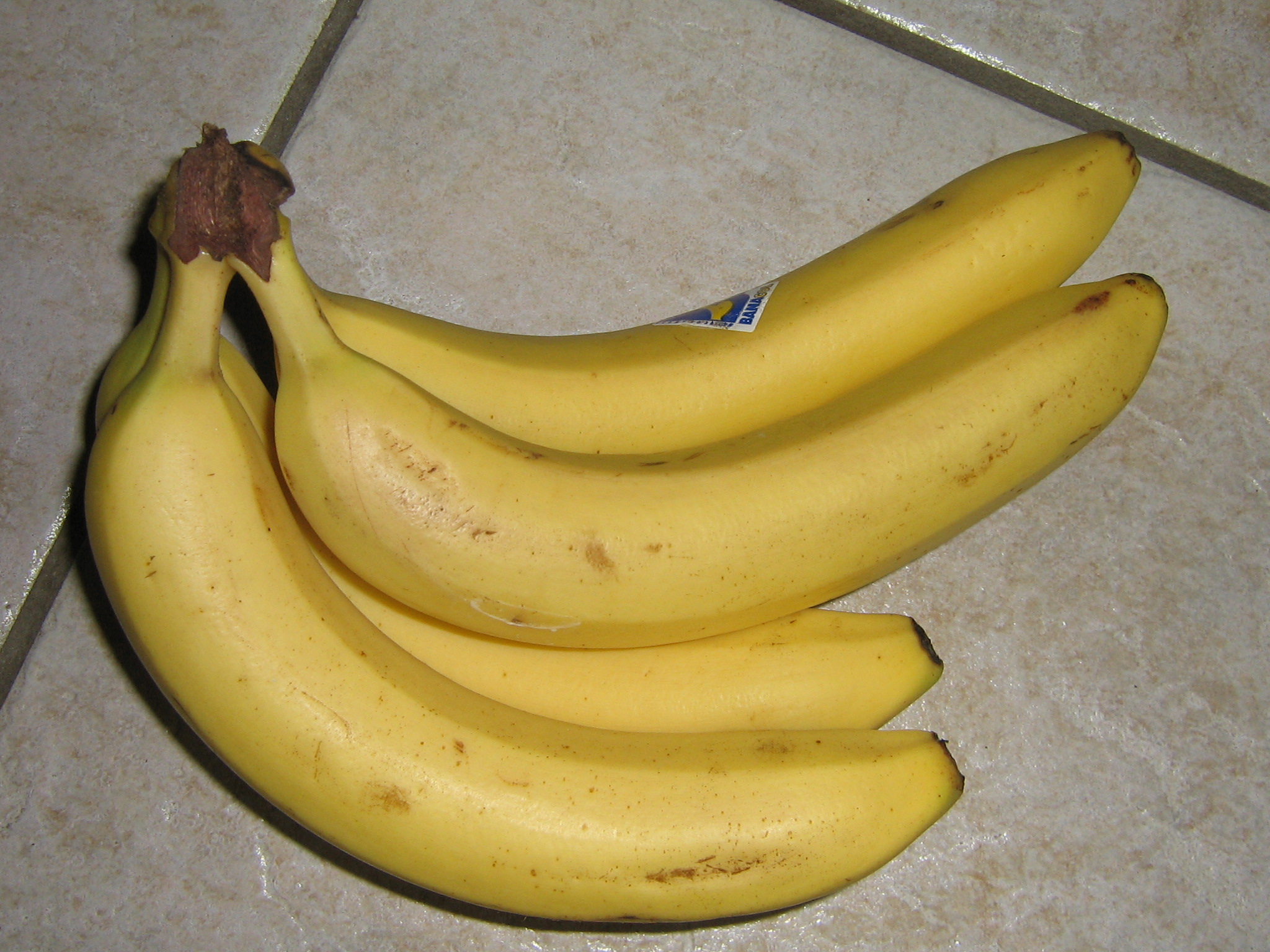
"…Bananas arrive in Hamburg straight and are bent here in the port."

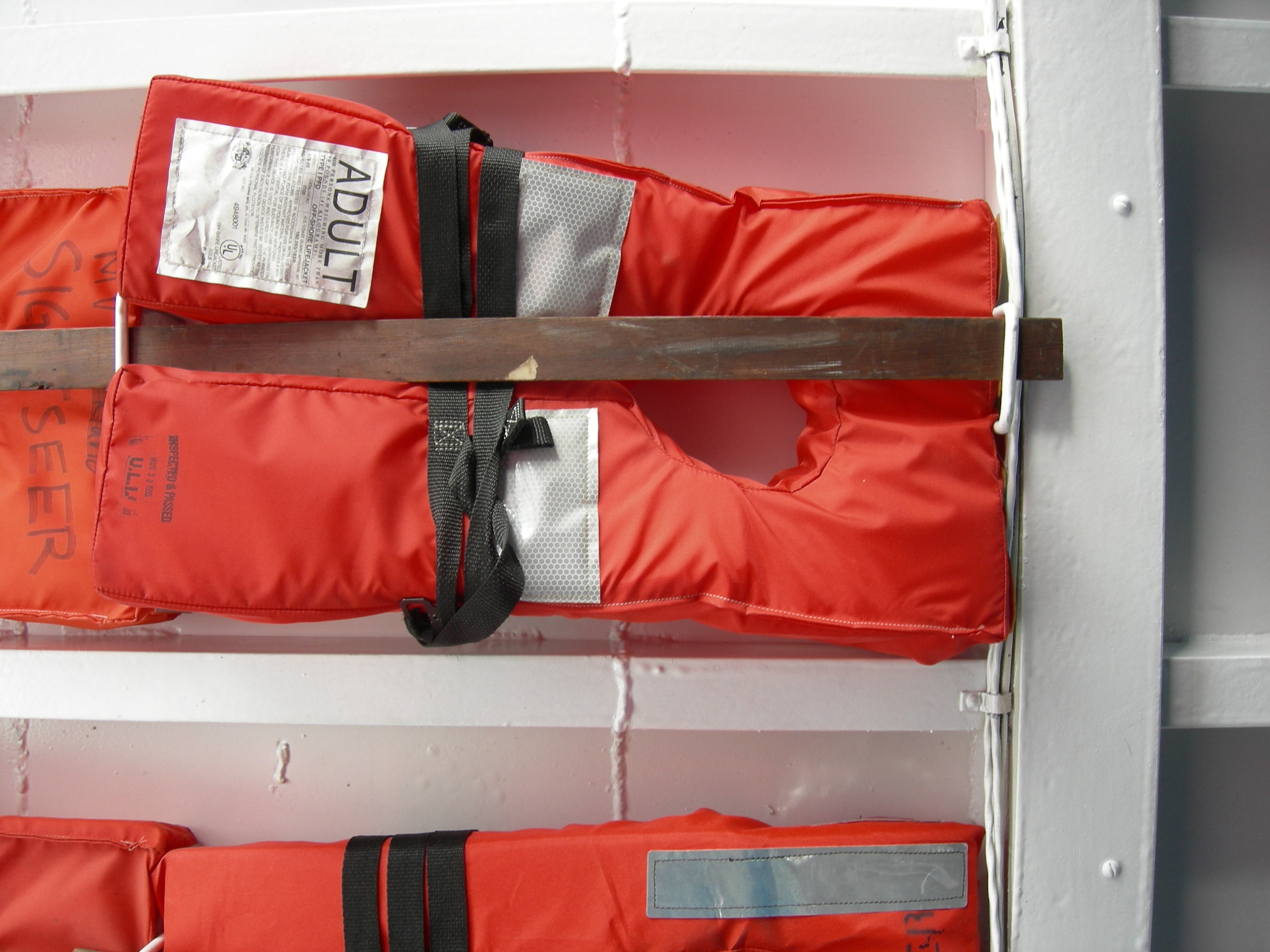
"Please be aware that among the life jackets under the seats, one is full of lead. This is for mothers-in-law."

The call changed into a name for the whole profession mid of the 20th century. The first written source is the Hamburg dictionary of 1956.
