= Blohm+Voss =

German shipbuilding and engineering company

Blohm+Voss B.V. & Co. KG
- Type: Subsidiary (KG)
- Industry: Shipbuilding
- Predecessor: H. C. Stülcken Sohn
- Founded: 1877
- Founders: Hermann Blohm; Ernst Voss
- Headquarters: Hamburg, Germany; Paris, France
- Area served: Worldwide
- Key people: Klaus Borgschulte, Tim Wagner, Dirk Malgowski, Lena Ströbele
- Products: Ships and yachts
- Services: Repair, refit and new construction
- Owner: Lürssen Yachts, Rheinmetall naval ships
- Number of employees: 447 (2021)
- Parent: Lürssen Rheinmetall
- Website: blohmvoss.com

Blohm+Voss (B+V), also written historically as Blohm & Voss, Blohm und Voß etc., is a German shipbuilding and engineering company. Founded in Hamburg in 1877 to specialise in steel-hulled ships, its most famous product was the World War II battleship Bismarck. In the 1930s, its owners established the Hamburger Flugzeugbau aircraft manufacturer which, shortly before the outbreak of World War II, adopted the name of its parent company. Following a difficult period after the war, B+V was revived, changing ownership among several owners, such as Thyssen Group and Star Capital.

In 2016 it became a subsidiary of Lürssen and supplied both the military and civilian markets before becoming subsidiary of Rheinmetall in 2025.

The company serves two areas – new construction of warships as NVL B.V. & Co. KG, and new construction and refitting of megayachts. The company has been in operation, building ships and other large machinery, almost continuously for 149 years.

== History ==
=== Early years ===
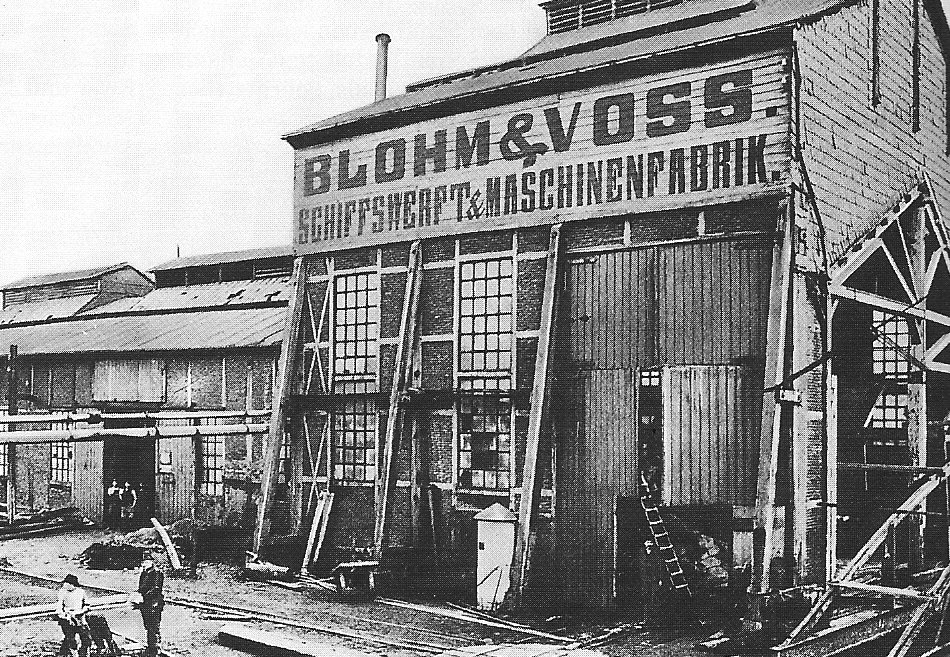
Blohm & Voss 1877

Blohm & Voss was founded on 5 April 1877 by Hermann Blohm and Ernst Voss (or Voß) as a general partnership, to build steel-hulled ships. It established a shipyard on the island of Kuhwerder, near the Free and Hanseatic City of Hamburg, covering 15,000 m^{2} (160,000 sq ft) with 250 m (820 ft) of water frontage and three building berths, two suitable for ships of up to 100 m (330 ft) length. The company name was shown with the ampersand, as B&V, until 1955.

Shipbuilding was at that time dominated by the British, with even German customers preferring to buy from them. Initial business was confined to ship repairs, although B&V managed to build and later sell the three-masted barque National. Eventually the first new-build order arrived for the small cargo paddle-steamer Burg, and the business took off. By 1882, the company had gained a reputation for quality and punctuality and was prospering.

Initially, their products were steel-hulled sailing ships designed for long sea voyages. At that time steamships had a relatively short range, while many of the advantages of steel construction still applied to sailing ships as much as to steam. The company built its first steamship in 1900, while still continuing to build sailing ships until the late 1930s.

=== The Nazi era, 1933–1945 ===
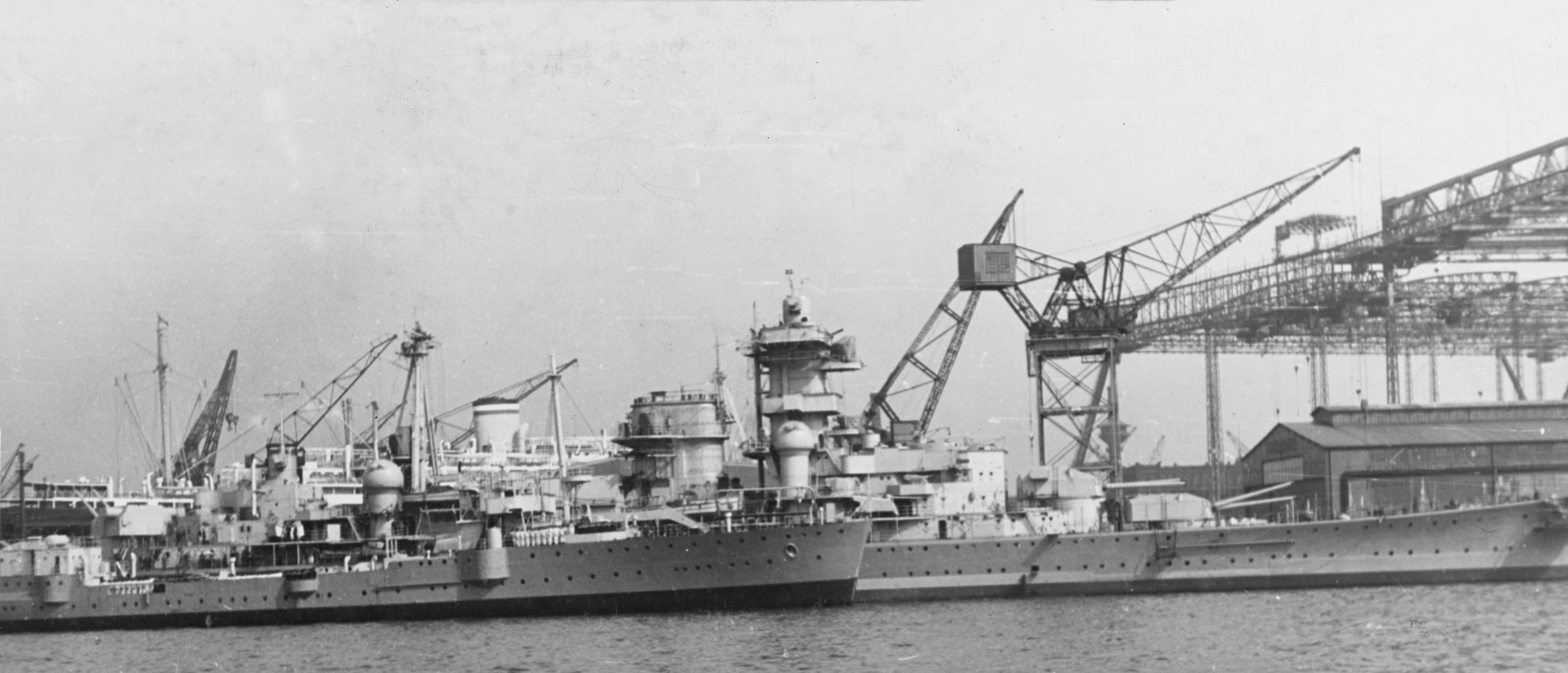
German heavy cruiser Admiral Hipper at Blohm & Voss shipyards in 1939

When Hermann Blohm died, his two sons Rudolf Blohm and Walther Blohm took over. Ernst Voss left soon afterwards. By this time the company was in financial crisis, so the Blohm brothers diversified into aircraft, setting up the Hamburger Flugzeugbau (see below) in the summer of 1933.

With the rise of the Nazi Party to power in 1933, Germany began to rearm and both companies became increasingly involved in the programme. The shipyard built both civilian craft and warships for the government, including the battleship Bismarck, before manufacturing U-boats in quantity.

In 1944 a subcamp of Neuengamme concentration camp was set up at the company's shipyard in Hamburg-Steinwerder. It supplied labour to the company from July 1944 to April 1945. A report dated 29 August states:

500 foreign female concentration camp prisoners, political, and criminal. Adjacent barracks camp, 11 guards, 17,000 m barbed wire, 380 Volts, tripwire. . . . The German foremen should be replaced by prisoners because the inmate overseers take a tougher line. Work performance is highly satisfactory. Productivity is higher than with the same number of German workers because work hours are longer and absenteeism is lower. . . . The gentlemen are of the opinion that the conditions sound harsher than they actually are.

Rudolf Blohm was present during this visit.

A memorial stands on the site of the camp and the company continues to pay an undisclosed amount to the Fund for Compensation of Forced Laborers. Steinwerder was badly damaged during the bombing of Hamburg in World War II and at the end of it, shipbuilding was forbidden.

=== Hamburger Flugzeugbau ===
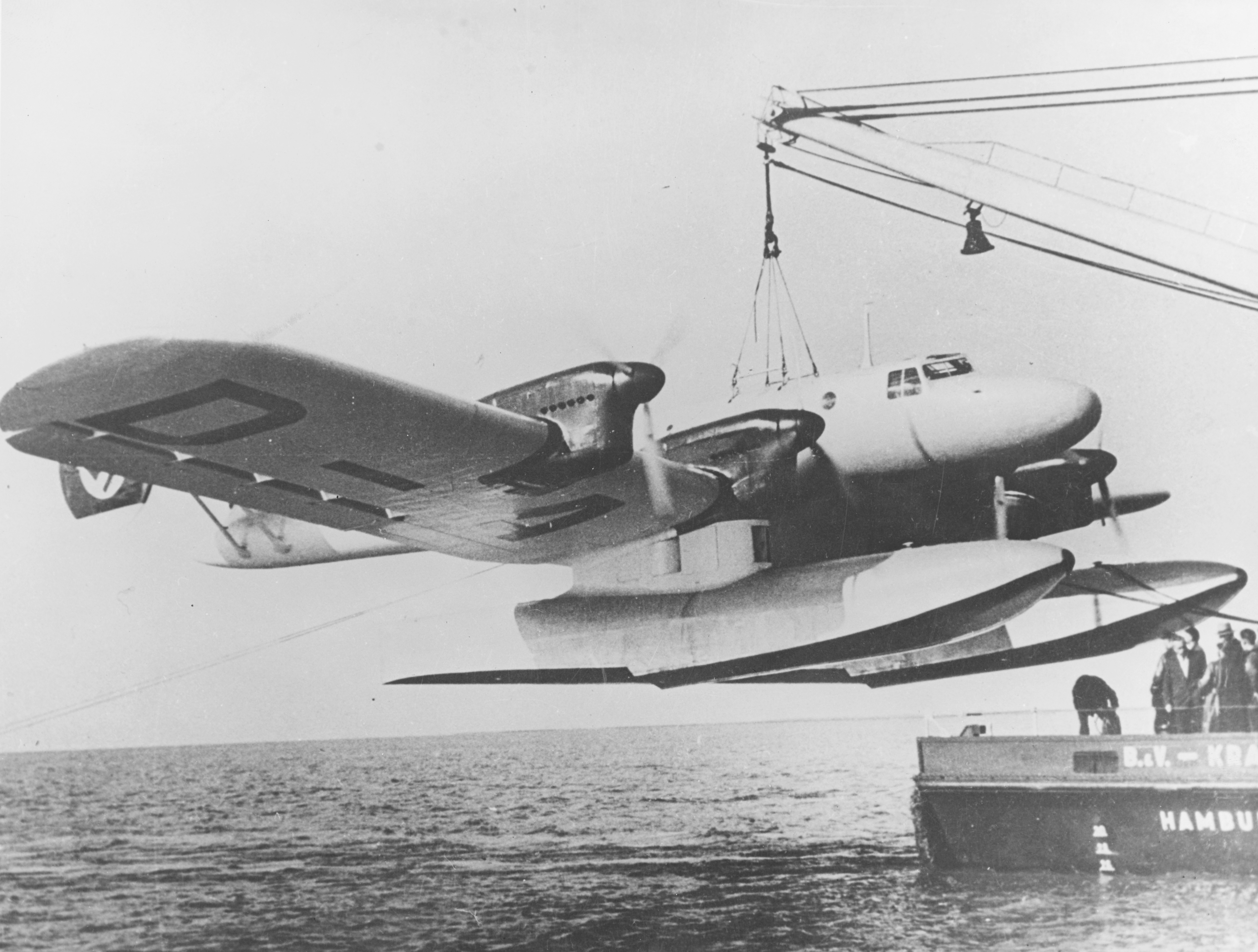
Ha 139

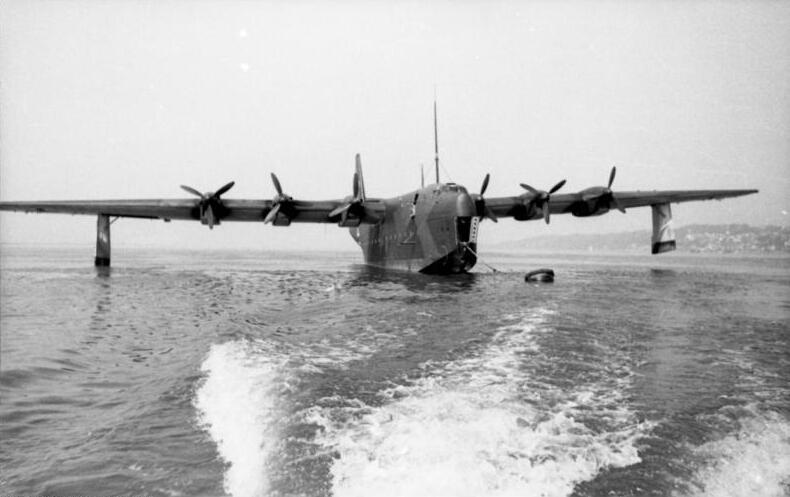
BV 238, largest Axis aircraft design to fly

In 1933 Blohm & Voss was suffering a financial crisis from lack of work. Its owners, brothers Rudolf and Walther Blohm, decided to diversify into aircraft manufacture, believing that there would soon be a market for all-metal, long-range flying boats, especially with the German state airline Deutsche Luft Hansa. They also felt that their experience with all-metal marine construction would prove an advantage. They formed the Hamburger Flugzeugbau that summer.

Most of the aircraft built by HFB/B&V would in fact be other companies' designs and major subassemblies, contracted under license, including tens of thousands of aircraft each for Dornier, Heinkel, Junkers and Messerschmitt. Alongside its volume manufacturing the company also maintained its own design office and workshops which continued to develop and build new types throughout the company's life. The first planes it produced were designated with the official RLM company code "Ha".

The aircraft produced by Hamburger Flugzeugbau were still commonly associated with Blohm & Voss and this was causing confusion, so in September 1937 Hamburger Flugzeugbau was renamed Abteilung Flugzeugbau der Schiffswerft Blohm & Voss and the RLM changed its company code to "BV".

Its most significant designs were flying boats, mainly used by the Luftwaffe for maritime patrol and reconnaissance. Most numerous was the BV 138 Seedrache (initiated as the Ha 138), a twin-boom trimotor, while the BV 222 Wiking was much larger. Largest of all was the BV 238 prototype, the largest aircraft built by any of the Axis forces. Other notable types include the asymmetric BV 141, which was built in moderate numbers but did not enter production.

At the end of the war, aircraft production was shut down. Hamburger Flugzeugbau GmBH (HFB) re-emerged in 1956, still under the ownership of Walther Blohm but no longer connected to B+V. It reopened the former B+V aircraft factory at Finkenwerder and subsequently underwent various further changes of ownership and company name, eventually becoming part of Airbus.

=== Postwar ===
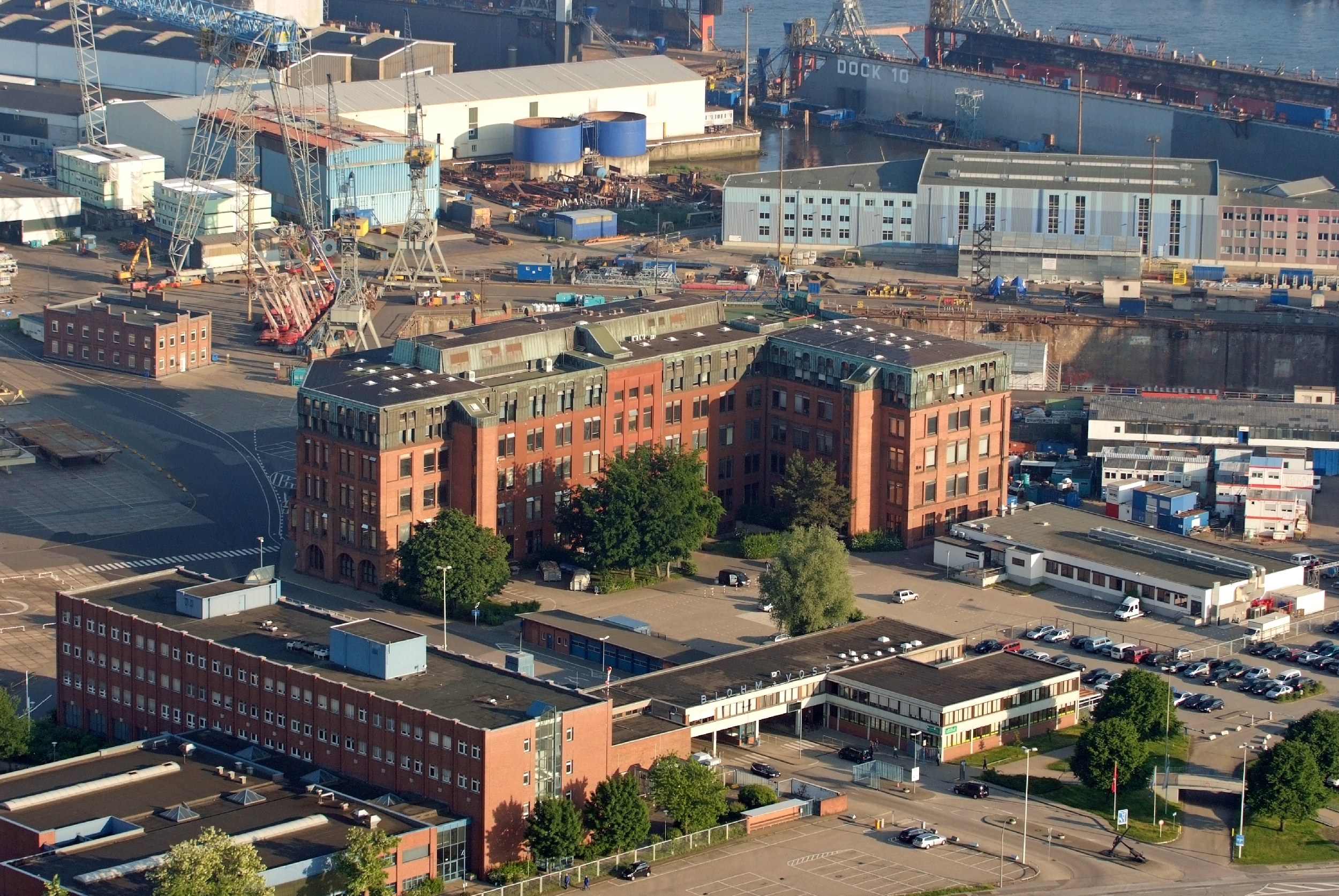
Administrative building

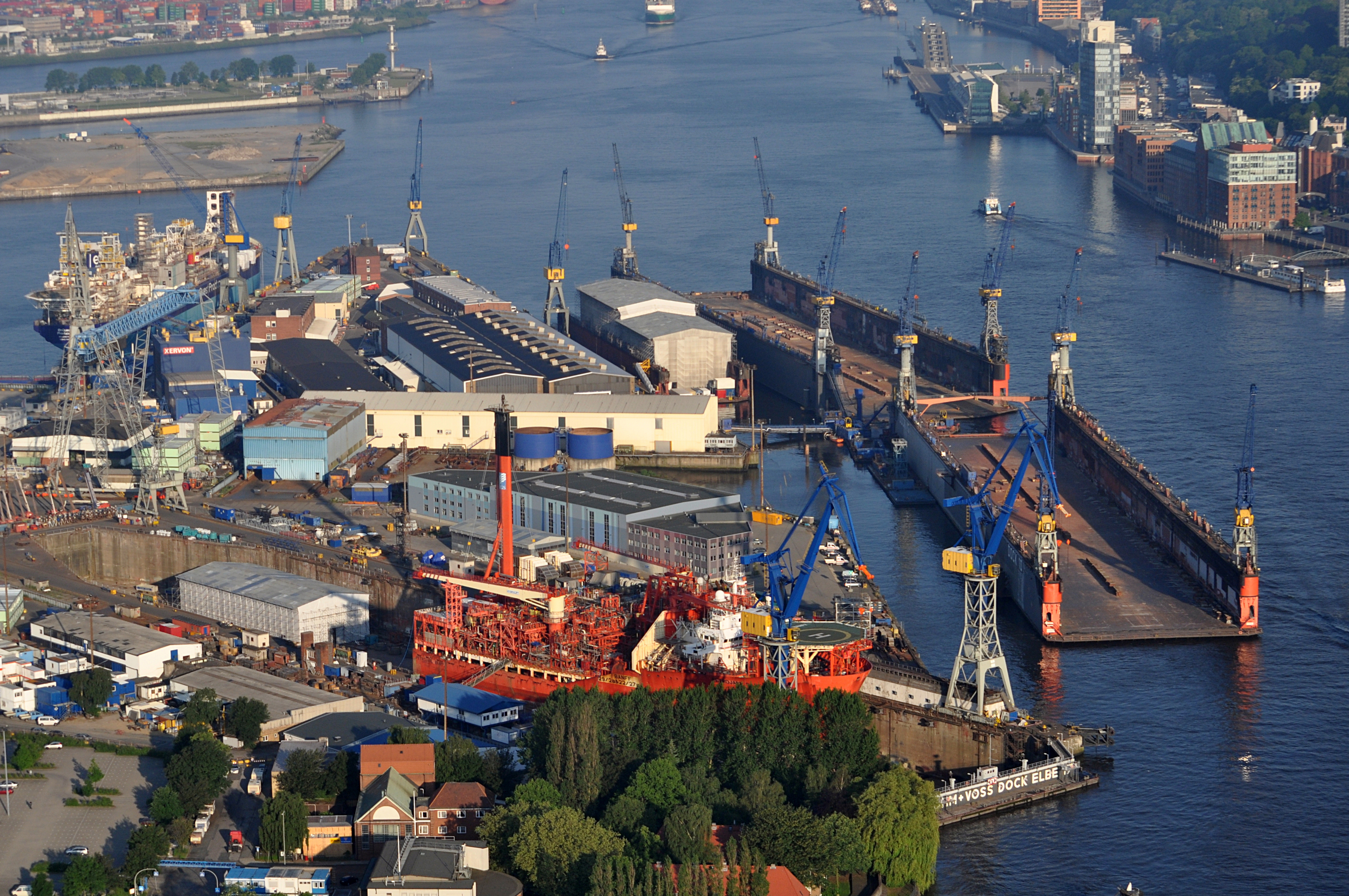
Blohm+Voss, between Kuhwerder Port, Nordelbe and Norderloch

After the Second World War, the British continued to demolish the shipyards of Steinwerder. B&V, unable to restart shipbuilding work, all but ceased to exist for several years.

In 1950, B&V created a new subsidiary company, Steinwerder Industrie AG, to manufacture machinery and boilers on the site. Its shipyard fortunes began to revive in 1952 when the new company was allowed to restart ship repair work and the City of Hamburg subsequently guaranteed it credit. By 1953 some 900 workers were back in employment. The building of new ships would later also be allowed again; the first ship built was the Wappen von Hamburg in 1955. During this period of resurrection the level of investment required meant that B&V moved out of private hands and became a publicly quoted company, 50% owned by Phoenix-Rheinrohr AG, itself soon to be consolidated into the Thyssen Group. Even so, B&V would never regain its former size. In 1966 it took over neighbouring shipbuilder H. C. Stülcken Sohn.

During the postwar years, B+V built oil rigs and developed a market for other offshore products such as support ships and pipelines. The company has also built ships for numerous commercial customers, including luxury yachts. Eclipse, built for Russian billionaire Roman Abramovich, is 162 metres (531 ft 6 in) in length making it the second longest private yacht in the world. B+V still administers the Elbe 17 dry dock at Hamburg. The semi-submersible drilling rig "Chris Chenery" was constructed in 1974 for The Offshore Co. of Houston, US. When Thyssen AG and Krupp merged in 1999, B+V became a subsidiary of ThyssenKrupp Marine Systems.

In December 2001, Blohm+Voss, Nordseewerke and Friedrich Lurssen Werft were awarded the contract to build the first five K130 MEKO frigates for the German Navy. The first of them, Braunschweig, was built at Blohm+Voss, launched in April 2006 and commissioned in April 2008. Several problems with the equipment fit delayed commissioning, and the last was commissioned in 2013.

In 2011 ThyssenKrupp agreed the sale of the Blohm+Voss civil shipbuilding division to British investment company STAR Capital Partners. The military division remained with ThyssenKrupp.

In October 2016, regulatory approval was given for Lürssen to acquire Blohm+Voss from STAR Capital Partners. In April 2017 the company dismissed 300 employees from which were 1000.

In September 2017, the German Navy commissioned the construction of five K130 corvettes by a consortium of North German shipyards including ThyssenKrupp Marine Systems, Blohm+Voss, and the German Naval Yards in Kiel. The Lürssen Group, which would be the main contractor in the production of the vessels, distributed its work between the two sites at Wolgast and B+V Hamburg to build only two, Köln in 2021 and Emden in 2022. The contract was worth around 2 billion euros.

On 25 July 2019, Peter Lürßen invested €20 million into the shipyard. Dock 10 was covered with a roof 200m-long and 50m-high for a cost of €13 million. The mounting of steel pillars above the dock's walls started in October 2020. On 29 April 2021, the hull of the yacht Opera, also called Coral Ocean, was transferred from Dock 17 to Dock 10 and both were tugged to Berne, Germany to stay at least 2 years. The previous 146-m Sassi, which was burned to the point that only the engine section block remained, formed part of Opera. Lürßen's Dock 3 was transferred to the Jade shipyard at Wilhelmshaven. In Berne, a hall was extended. Mein Schiff 3 then docked in Dock 17, followed by AIDAcara and AIDAmar, the latest cruise ships to visit the dock.

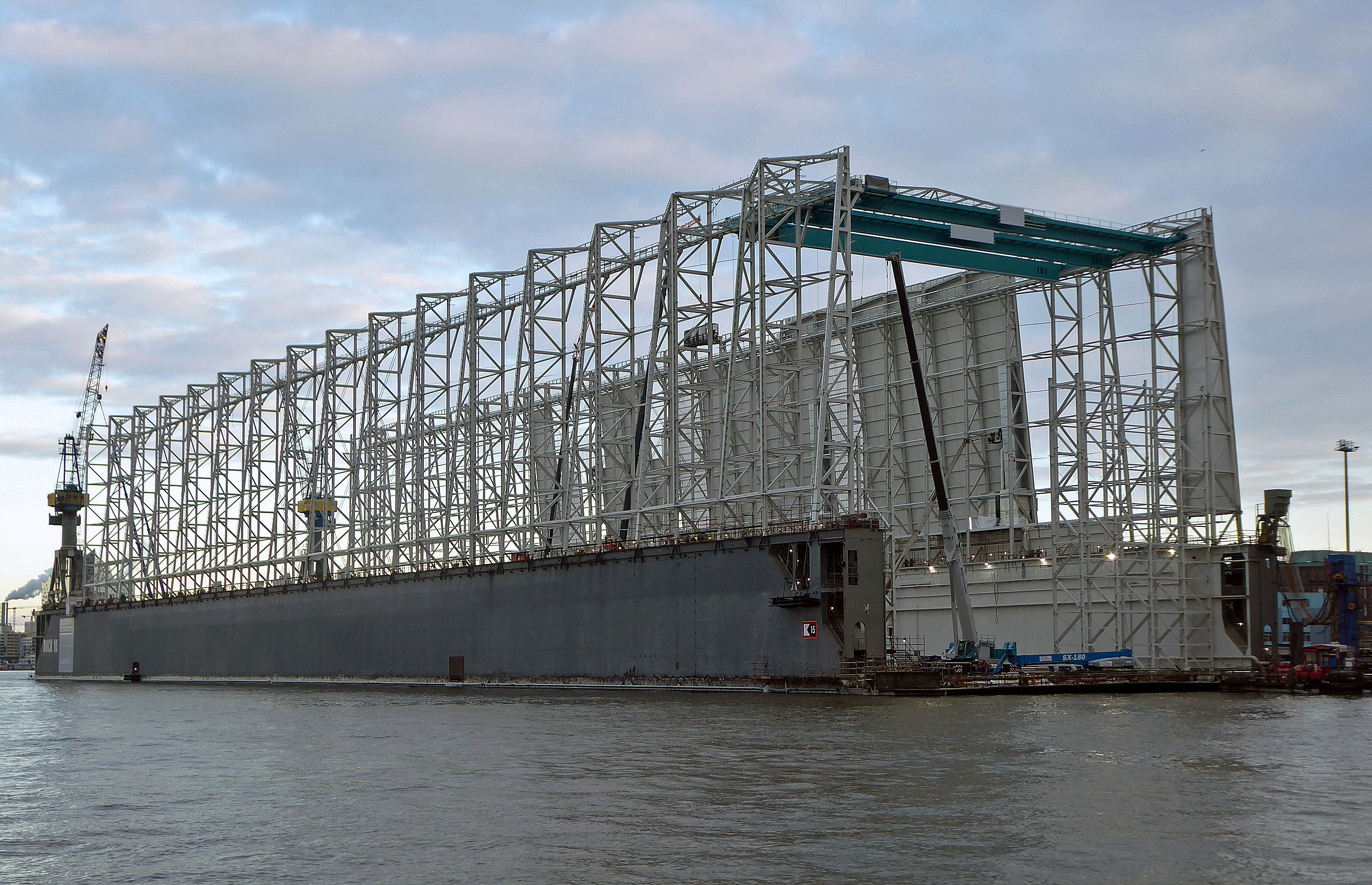
Dock 10 covered

=== Since October 2021 ===
According to an interview and meeting published in Hamburger Morgenpost on 30 September 2021 and repeated at Hamburger Abendblatt, the workforce was advised that Lürssen would no longer refit cruise ships in Hamburg anymore. The new building department was dissolved. All six floating docks were in review. The repair division was not a success. Despite the around 20 million euros invested in modern shipyard technology, the subletting of many halls and the shrinkage to only around a third of the used shipyard area, the costs were still too high and is not yet fit for the future. The location is too expensive compared to other shipyards, so structural measures and cost adjustments were necessary.

In a statement, NVL B.V. & Co. KG, military naval ships construction, which belonged to Lürssen was sold to Rheinmetall in September 2025. Naval Vessels Lürssen (NVL) operates four shipyards in northern Germany.

== Ships built ==
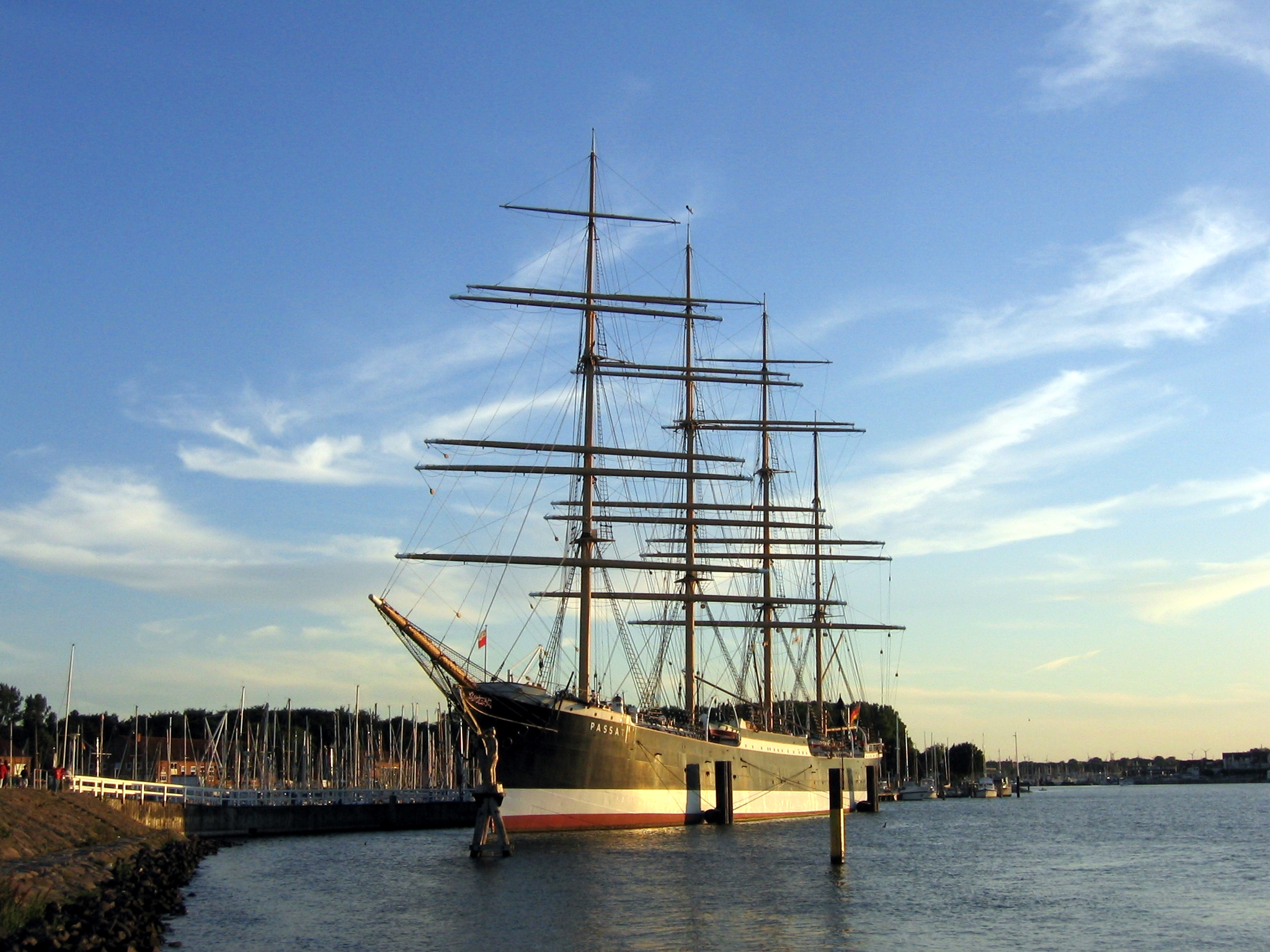
Passat

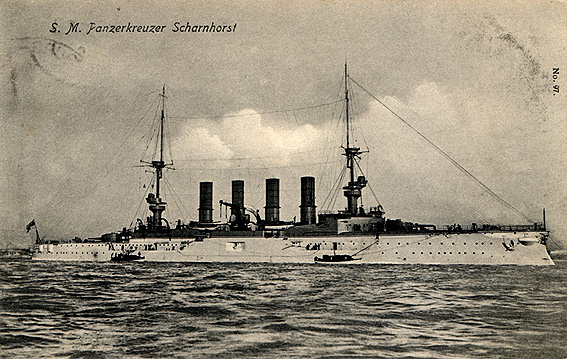
SMS Scharnhorst

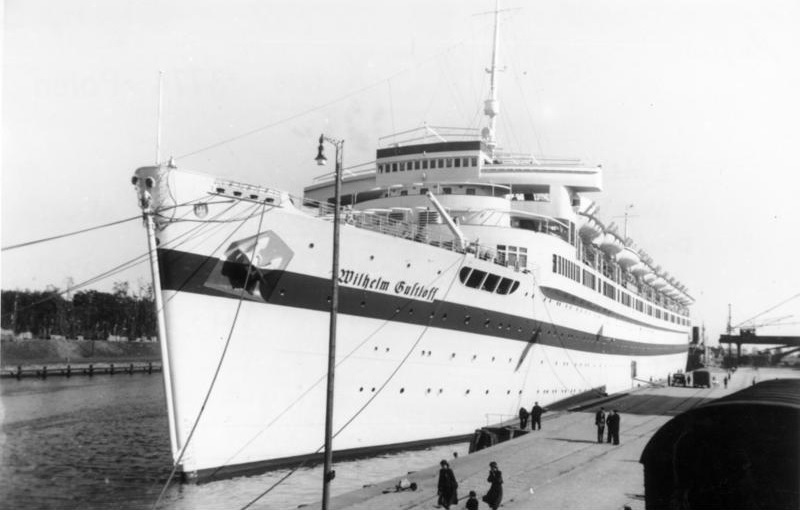
Wilhelm Gustloff

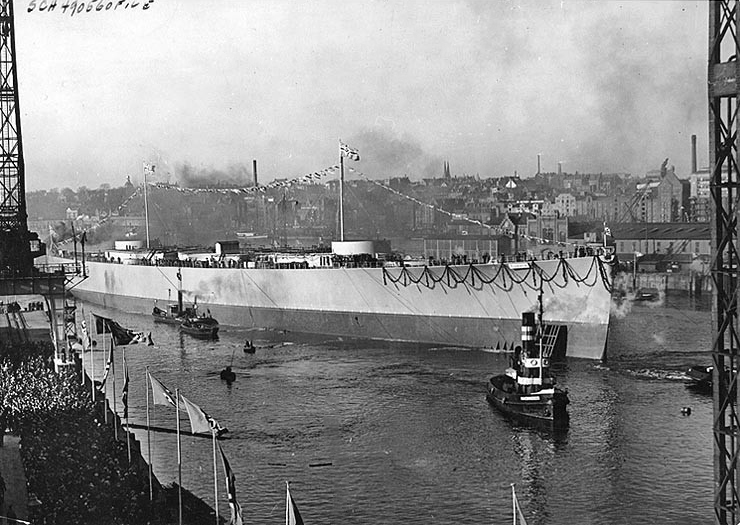
Bismarck

FPSO EnQuest Producer under Star Capital

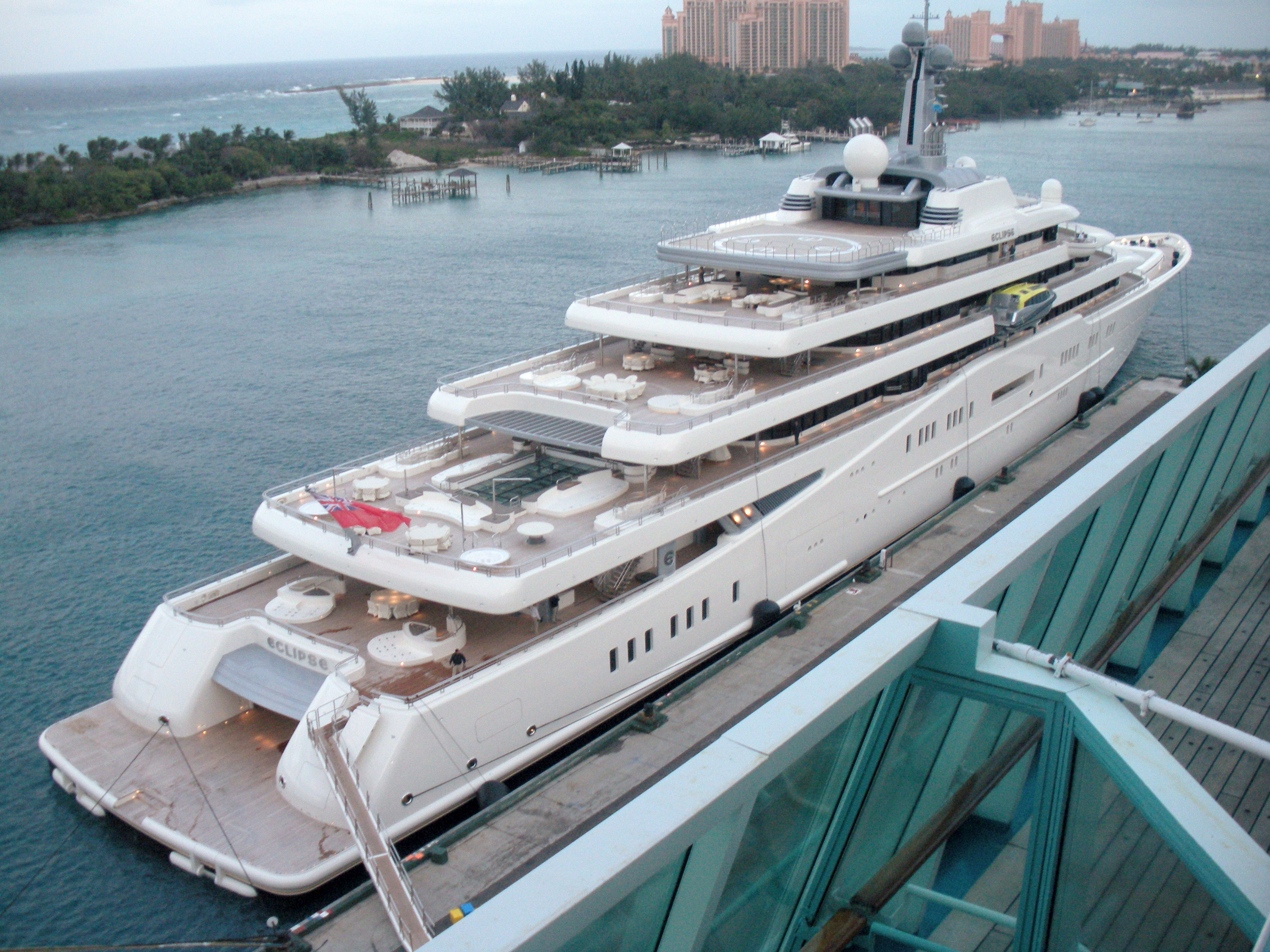
Eclipse

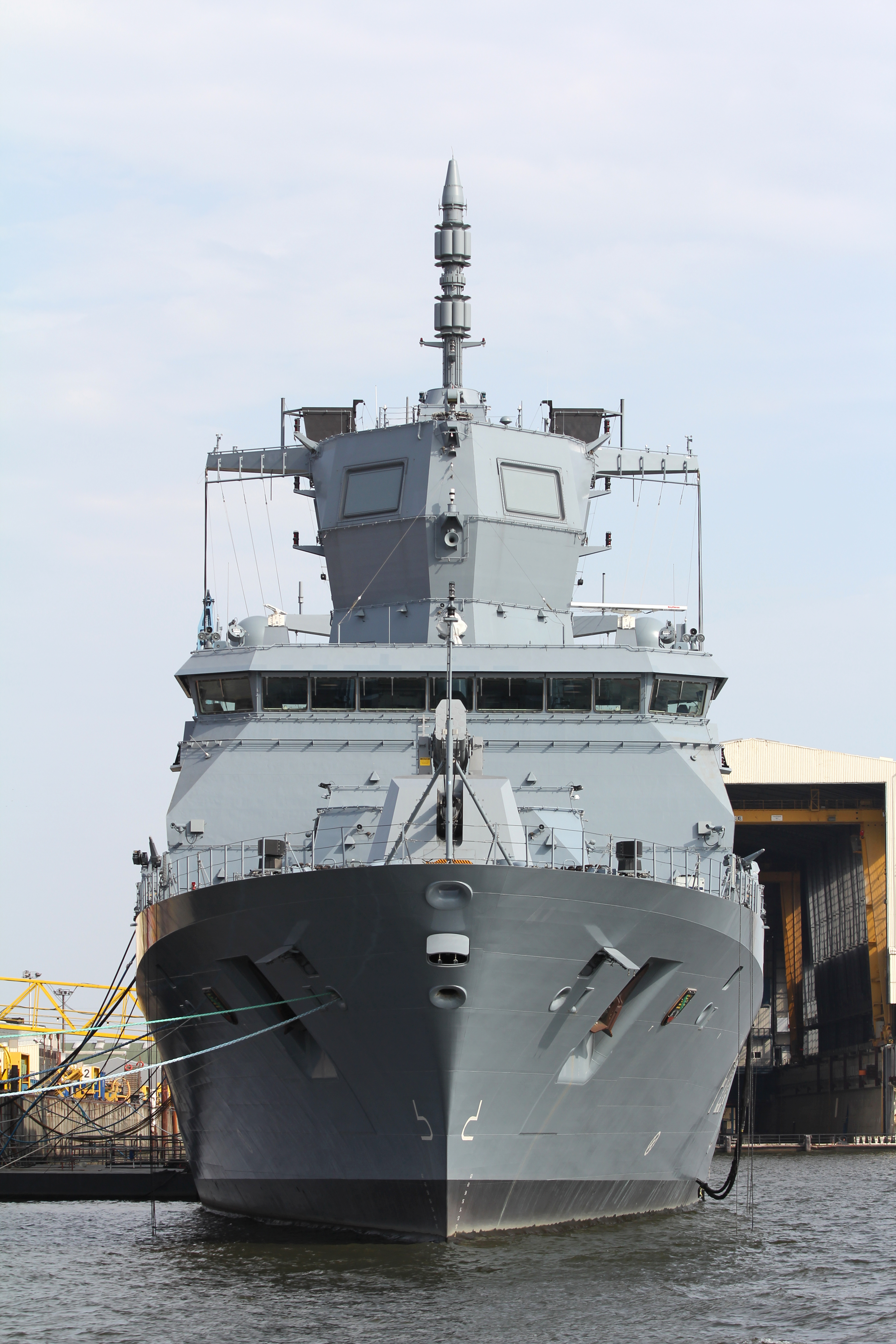
The frigate Sachsen-Anhalt of the German Navy

Blohm & Voss was established in the days of sail and, although it built ships with steel hulls from the first, it did not produce a significant steamship until 1900. Of the many hundreds of ships built by B+V, notable examples include:

=== Tall ships ===
- Flying P-Liners, including Petschili (1903), Pamir (1905), Passat (1911), Peking (1911), Pola (1916) and Priwall (1917)
- Prinzess Eitel Friedrich (1909) (later Dar Pomorza)
- Gorch Fock-class of three-masted barques and school ships, including Gorch Fock (1933), Eagle (1936, ex-Horst Wessel), Sagres (1937, ex-Albert Leo Schlageter), Mircea (1938) and Gorch Fock (1958).

=== Ocean liners and other passenger ships ===
- Prinzessin Victoria Luise (1900), a Hamburg America Line ship, the first ship built exclusively for cruising
- RMS Majestic (1914), a White Star Line liner and the largest ship in the world until the completion of Normandie in 1935
- SS Leviathan (1914), a United States Lines liner and sister ship to RMS Majestic. Scrapped in 1938
- SS Cap Arcona (1927), a Hamburg Süd liner sunk with great loss of life near the end of the Second World War
- SS Monte Cervantes (1927), a Hamburg Süd liner lost near Tierra del Fuego in 1930
- SS Europa (1928), a Norddeutscher Lloyd liner and Blue Riband winner
- MV Monte Rosa (1930), a passenger liner and cruise ship that would become better known as the troopship Empire Windrush
- MV Monte Pascoal (1930), a passenger liner and cruise ship. Sister ship of Monte Rosa and Monte Cervantes
- SS Potsdam (1935), a Norddeutscher Lloyd turbo-electric liner that served as an Allied troopship and then the Pakistani pilgrim ship Safina-E-Hujjaj
- TS Pretoria (1936) and TS Windhuk (1936), Deutsche Ost-Afrika Linie passenger cargo liners
- MV Wilhelm Gustloff (1937), a Kraft durch Freude ("Strength Through Joy") cruise ship whose sinking was history's worst maritime disaster by lives lost
- SS Jagiełło (1939), a Polish passenger liner built as Dogu, and later Pyotr Velikiy
- MV Aurora (1955) as Wappen Von Hamburg. It was the first luxury liner to be built after World War II
- MV Explorer (2001), used by the Semester at Sea university study abroad program

=== Private yachts ===
- A – 119 m (390 ft) owned by Russian billionaire Andrey Melnichenko
- Dubai – owned by the ruler of the Emirate of Dubai and the Prime Minister of the United Arab Emirates, Sheikh Mohammed bin Rashid Al Maktoum
- Eclipse – the second-largest private yacht, owned by Russian billionaire Roman Abramovich.
- Enigma – a yacht ordered by Azcarraga, later owned by Larry Ellison and Aidan Barcaly.
- Grille – built as the German state yacht (1935), converted to minelayer at the beginning of World War II, later reconverted to state yacht of Nazi Germany, Hitler's official maritime conveyance.
- Lady Moura – owned by Saudi billionaire Dr Nasser al-Rashid.
- Kosatka (yacht) - believed to be one of Putin's yachts, delivered in 2014.
- MV Savarona – built for an American heiress in 1931. Later the Turkish Presidential yacht and now a charter yacht. Still among the largest yachts, at 446 feet (136 m) long.

=== Warships ===
==== Pre-dreadnought warships ====
- SMS Kaiser Karl der Grosse, battleship – first battleship to be built in the yard

==== Warships of World War I ====
- SMS Glyndwr, light seaplane carrier converted from a merchant ship
- SMS Von der Tann, battlecruiser
- SMS Goeben, battlecruiser
- SMS Moltke, battlecruiser
- SMS Scharnhorst, armoured cruiser
- SMS Seydlitz and SMS Derfflinger, battlecruisers that were heavily damaged in the Battle of Jutland; both stayed afloat and brought their crews home.

==== Warships of World War II ====
- Admiral Hipper, heavy cruiser
- Bismarck, battleship
- Cetatea Albă, minelayer (Romanian Navy)
- Many Type VII, Type XVII, Type XXI and Type XXVI U-boats

==== Modern warships ====
Ships built using the MEKO system are listed at MEKO.

Other modern warships designed and built by B&V include:

- Rheinland-Pfalz (F209), a Bremen-class frigate
- Brandenburg (F215), the first Brandenburg-class frigate
- Sachsen (F219), the first Sachsen-class frigate
- Z28-class patrol boats for the Argentine Coast Guard
