= MV Aurora (1955) =

Cruise ship

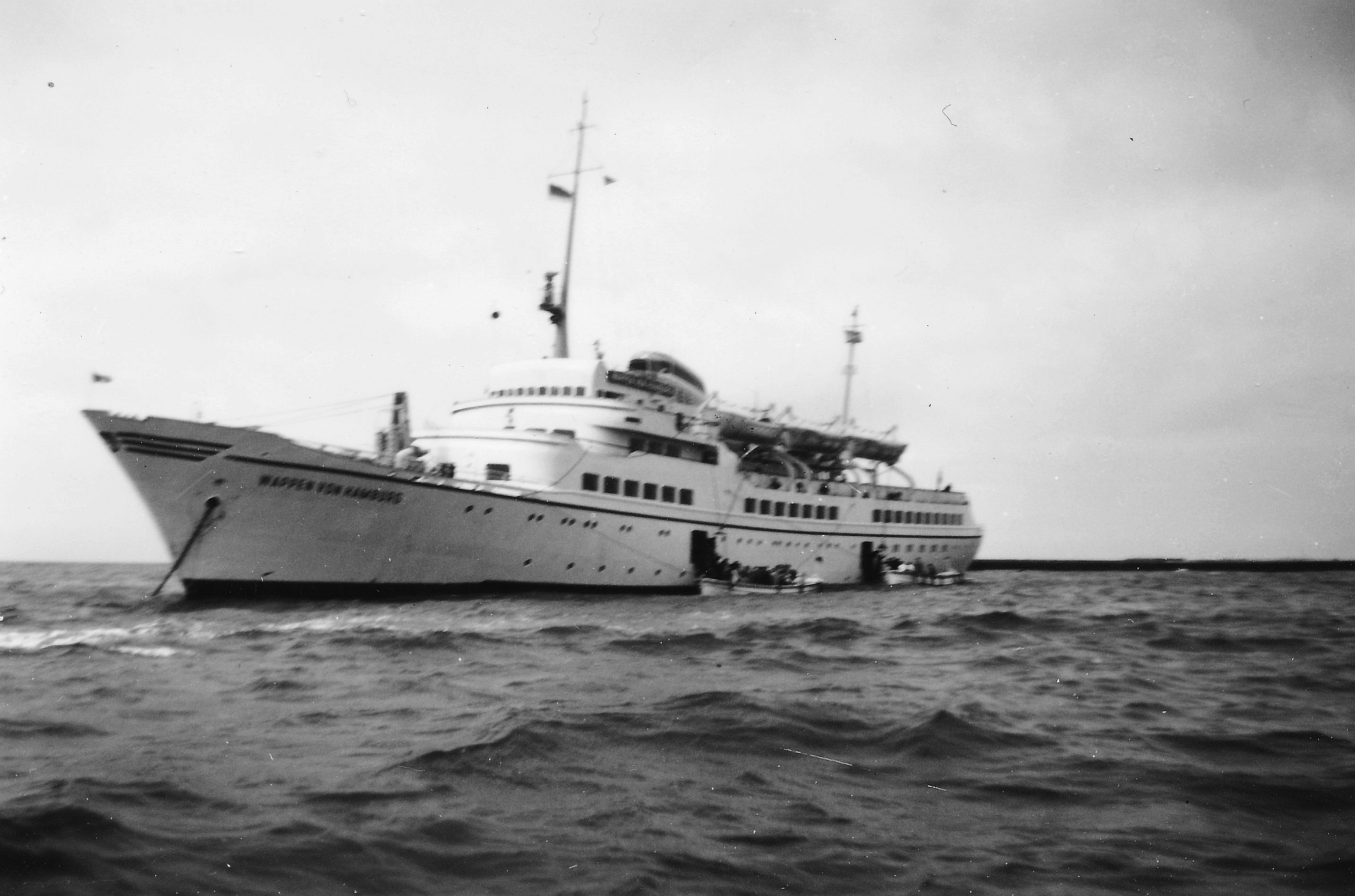
- Wappen von Hamburg in 1958 at Heligoland

History
- Name: 1955–1960: Wappen von Hamburg; 1960–1967: Delos; 1967–1970: Polar Star; 1970–1972: Pacific Star; 1972–1977: Xanadu; 1984–1991: Expex; 1991–2009: Faithful; 2009–2025: Aurora
- Owner: 1955–1960: HADAG; 1960–1967: Nomikos Line; 1967–1970: West Tour; 1972–1974: Xanadu Cruises; 1974–1982: J. Eisenberg; 1982–1984: Pan Aleutian Seafoods; 1984–1985: EXPEX; 1985–1991: Xanadu, Inc; 1991–1998: Friend Ships; 2005–2023: Chris Willson; 2023–2025: Unknown
- Port of registry: 1955–1960: Hamburg, West Germany; 1961–1967: Piraeus, Greece; 1967–1983: Vancouver, Canada; 1983–1985: Tacoma, Washington; 1985–2009: Los Angeles, California; 2009–2025: San Francisco, California
- Builder: Blohm & Voss
- Launched: February 1, 1955
- Completed: May 14, 1955
- In service: 1955
- Identification: IMO number: 5088227
- Fate: Scrapped at Mare Island in May of 2025
- Notes: Original name Wappen von Hamburg means "Coat of arms of Hamburg" in German.

General characteristics
- Tonnage: 2,496 GRT
- Beam: 13.24m
- Propulsion: Maybach diesel engines
- Speed: 18 knots (33 km/h; 21 mph)
- Capacity: 1,955 (as a ferry): 1,600 passengers

MV Aurora was a cruise ship built in Germany in 1955. After several changes of ownership and name, as of 2024 she was moored in Stockton, California, United States, and was undergoing restoration until May 22 when she began to take on water and partially sank, damaging it beyond repair. In December 2024, the ship was towed away for scrapping, which was completed May 13, 2025.

== History ==
=== Passenger service ===
Aurora entered service in 1955 as Wappen von Hamburg for HADAG at Blohm & Voss, intended to be used for day-long cruises from Hamburg to Heligoland. Her maiden cruise in the North Sea carried a full complement of 1,600 passengers. Passengers were seated in salons and cafeterias on three decks, and enjoyed the view from galleries and sun decks. In the 1950s through -70s, this trip was a popular getaway, especially on weekends. Private cars were still not the norm, and a mini-cruise provided a change of scenery in comfort. Furthermore, visits to the Island of Heligoland were not possible before 1955. Until 1952, the island had been under UK administration and was used as a Royal Air Force and Royal Navy bombing target, completely devastating the infrastructure. Especially in the first years after starting to open for tourism again, many people were eager to see and visit the island for themselves that had been closed off for 20 years.

Her cruising speed of 17.5 knots (32.4 km/h; 20.1 mph) meant that the 90 nautical miles (170 km; 100 mi) trip from Hamburg to Heligoland would take 5 hours. This made day trips from Hamburg less than practical, because visitors would only have maybe two or three hours on the island. Most guests would take the train from Hamburg to Cuxhaven and only take the ship for the 36 nautical miles (67 km; 41 mi) from that port to the island. Still, the schedule presented a challenge. Therefore, Wappen von Hamburg was replaced after only seven years of service by a second ship of the same name. Her replacement in 1962 made 21.5 knots (39.8 km/h; 24.7 mph), meaning that day trippers now could spend up to two hours more on the island holding the same departure times. In 1960, Wappen Von Hamburg(1955) was sold to the Greek Nomikos Line. She was renamed Delos and refitted as one of the first luxury Aegean cruise ships, with the addition of a swimming pool and air conditioning in all cabins.

In 1967, the ship was sold to the Alaska Cruise Line (Westtours) of Vancouver and renamed to Polar Star for expedition cruises in Alaskan waters, then in 1970 resold to West Cruise Lines of Panama and renamed to Pacific Star and then Polar Star for expedition cruises in the South Atlantic. In 1972 Donald L. Ferguson bought her, renamed her Xanadu, and added antiques to her luxury fittings.

=== Post-cruising career ===
As the cruise industry began to fade, Xanadu was sold two further times and then in 1977 laid up and some of her fittings were auctioned. After repossession by a Seattle bank in Vancouver, she was sold in 1982 to Pan Aleutian Seafoods as a factory ship for crab, and in 1984 laid up again, in Tacoma.

In 1985, a new owner renamed her again to Expex and moored her at Los Angeles for trade show and exhibition use. A 40-foot (12 m) intermodal container was mounted on her stern.

After this venture was unsuccessful, the ship was sold to Friendships, a Christian sect based in Wilmington, California, who renamed her Faithful. They repainted her hull blue but instead of using her for relief work, housed converts on the ship until she was seized by the Coast Guard.

Dr. James Mitchell bought Faithful from Friendships to use as a hospital ship, but in 2005 sold the Faithful, which by now had rusting metal, fading and peeled paint, and missing railings, to Al Boraq Aviation, who planned to refurbish her as a luxury yacht and had her towed to Alameda. This refurbishment did not materialize; she was declared an abandoned vessel and eventually an arrangement was made to have her removed. In 2010 the Life After People episode "Holiday Hell" featured the ship with an interview with maritime enthusiast Peter Knego columnist for Maritime Matters on her history and condition.

=== Refurbishment ===
After seeing a Craigslist ad in 2008, Chris Willson bought the ship from the then owner, a marine salvage dealer who had been ordered by the California State Lands Commission to move the ship from Decker Island, in the San Joaquin River delta, but could not afford to do so. Willson had her towed to Rio Vista, where restoration work began, and then a year later, in August 2010, renamed Aurora, to Pier 38 in San Francisco, with plans to eventually open her as a tourist attraction. The following year, a Port of San Francisco wharfinger gave him three days' notice to move Aurora because Pier 38 was to be shut down due to structural and electrical issues.

Aurora was ultimately towed from San Francisco back to the delta in 2012 and moored at a marina in Little Potato Slough, approximately 15 miles from Stockton. Soon after, the marina went out of business over debts and regulatory problems, so Willson and his partner moved to the ship to watch over it. He worked with volunteers on restoring Aurora, with plans to find a location that would host her as a tourist attraction. In 2023 he sold the ship.

=== Sinking ===
On May 22, 2024, the ship was discovered to be taking on water and had partially sunk. The Coast Guard along with the California Department of Fish and Wildlife Office of Spill Prevention and Response set up a unified command to secure the area and minimize pollution from leaking petroleum products.

=== Scrapping ===
On December 20, 2024, the vessel was removed from her previous berth at Little Potato Slough, Stockton to be towed to Mare Island for drydocking and dismantling. The vessel arrived at Mare Island on December 21, 2024. Scrapping was completed May 13, 2025.

== In popular culture ==
The ship was an inspiration for The Love Boat and was used as a filming location for the 1963 film From Russia with Love and for 2025 film Bears on a Ship.
