= Elbe 17 =

Dry dock in Hamburg, Germany

Coordinates: 53°32′31″N 9°57′47″E

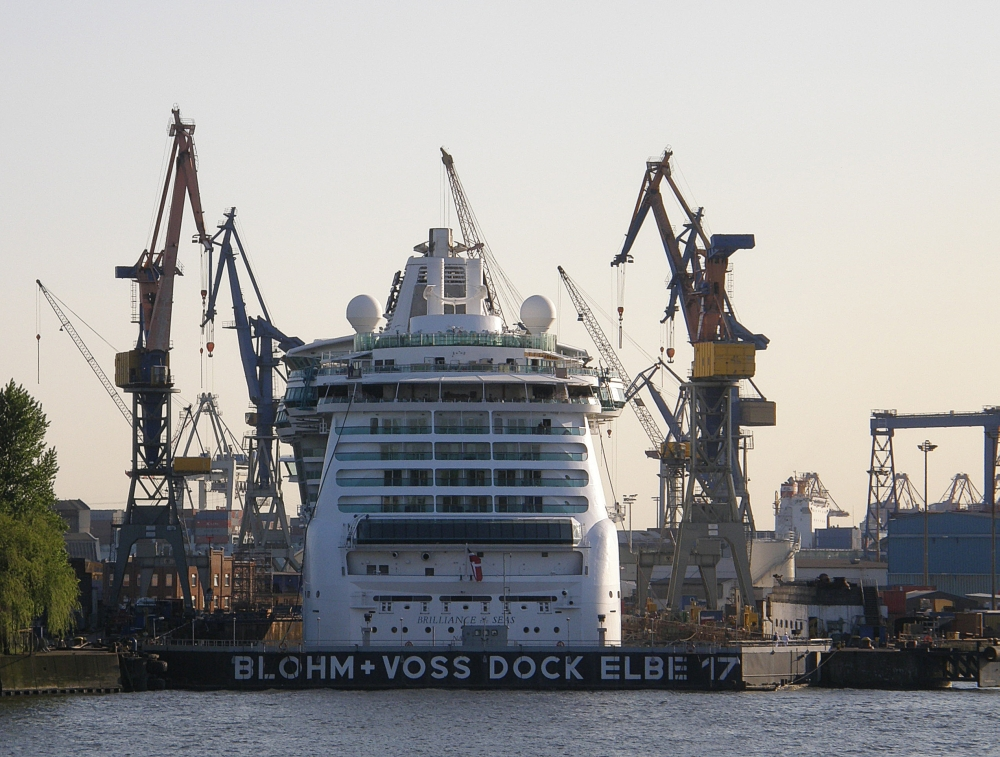
MS Brilliance of the Seas in Elbe 17 (2008).

Elbe 17 [ˈɛlbə ˈziːp.tseːn] is the third largest dry dock in Germany, located in Hamburg and administrated by shipbuilding company Blohm + Voss. Completed in 1942 at a length of 351 m (384 yd) and a width of 59 m (65 yd), it was originally intended for the construction of the massive H-class battleships.

During World War II, it was used for repair work only and also served as an air raid shelter (housing up to 6,000 people). After the war, the huge floatable metal gate was scrapped and the dock served as a berth. The British occupation forces originally planned to demolish the dock in January 1950, but popular protests and fears that the demolition would damage the nearby tunnel under the Elbe caused the dock to be preserved.

On December 12, 1967, construction of a new gate was completed and the first ship to enter the dock was the 190,000 ton tanker Myrina. Today, the dock is primarily used for refurbishing and repairing ships, although it can also be used for the construction of new vessels. The dock was notably used to perform maintenance on very large ships such as the container ship Sovereign Maersk (347 m long and 42.8 m wide), the cruise ship Freedom of the Seas (339 m long, 56 m wide), and the Queen Mary 2 (66,000 t, 345 m long, 41 m wide)

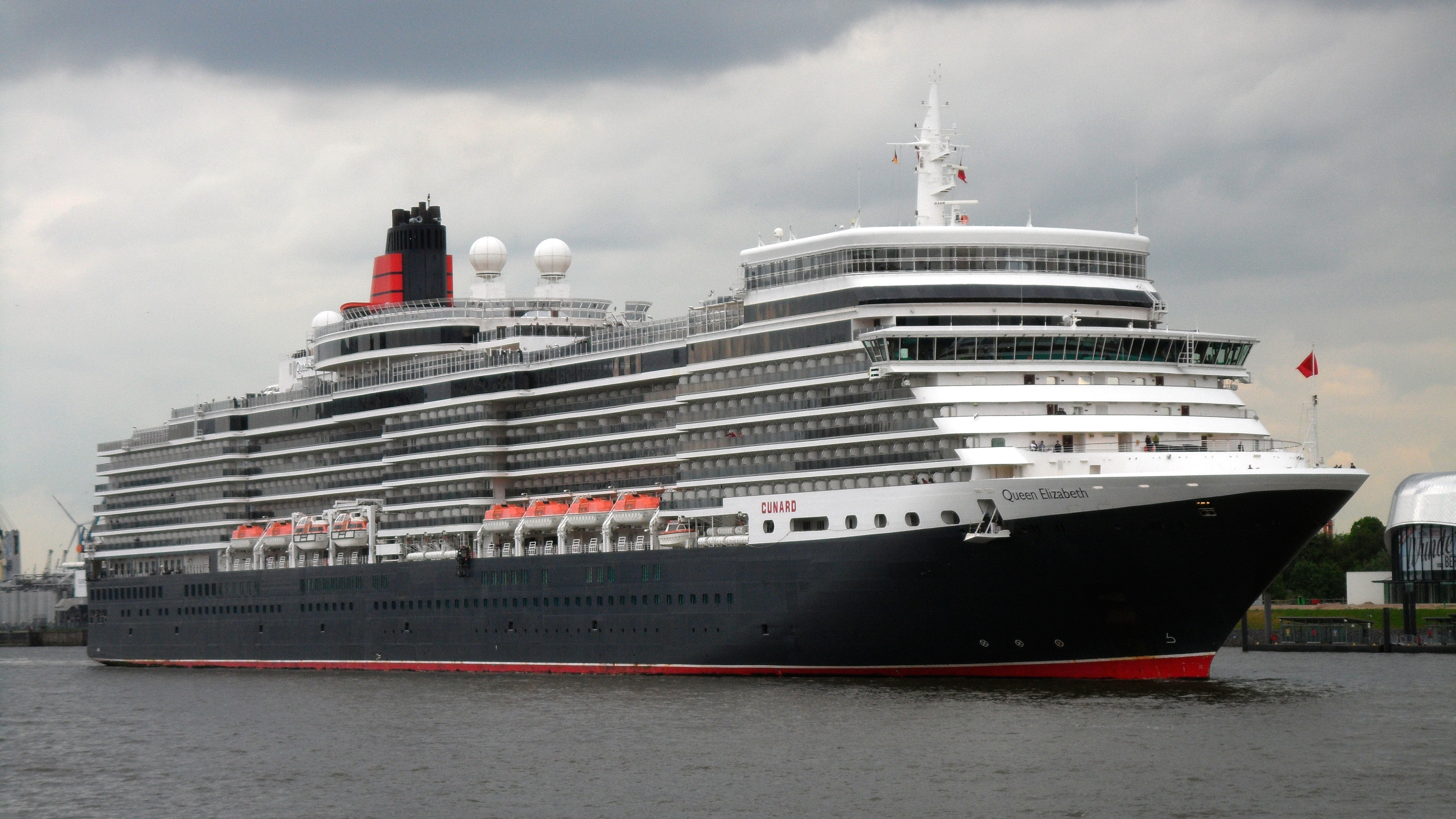
The Cunard passenger ship Queen Elizabeth arrives in Hamburg.

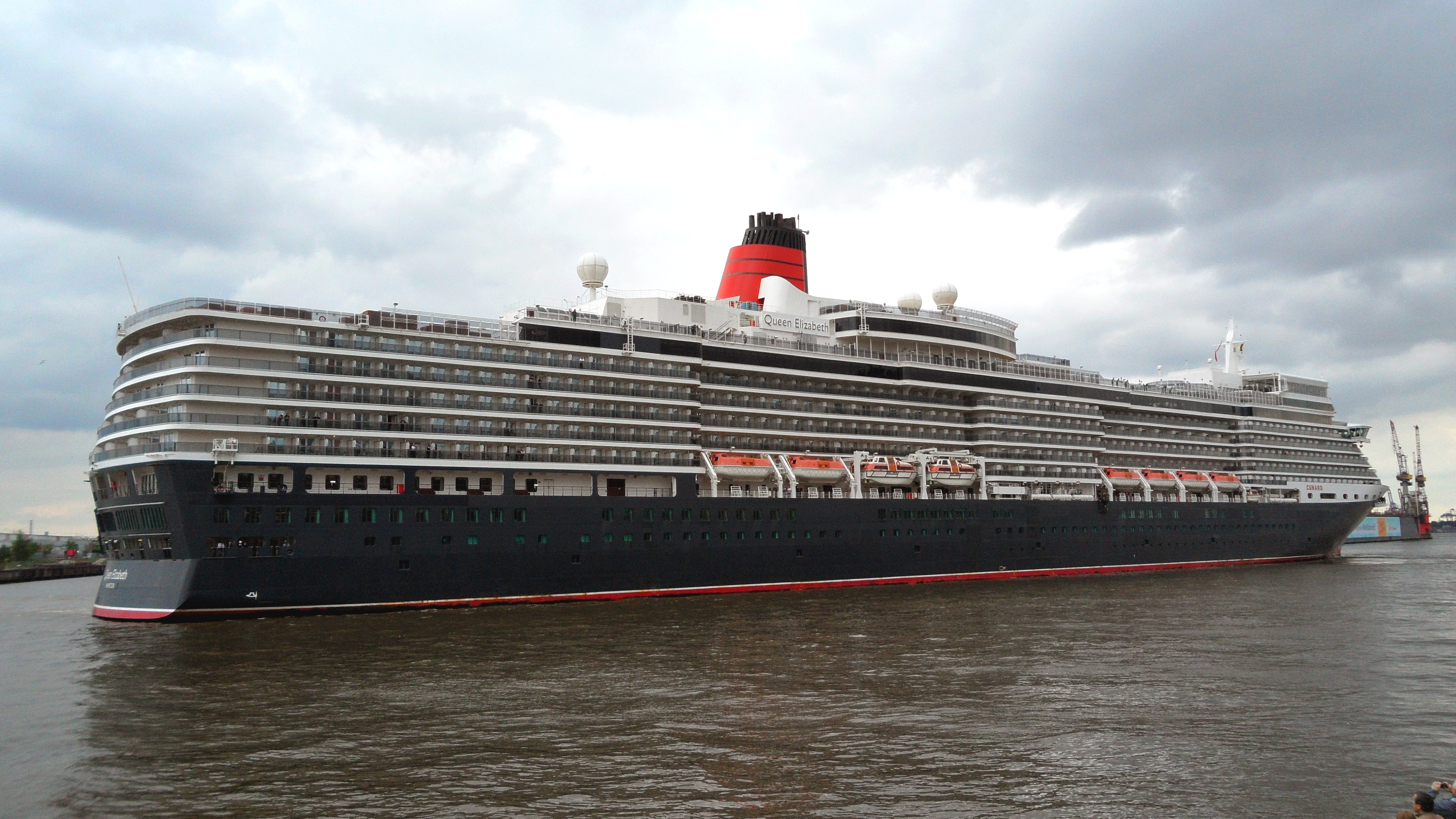
The ship turns towards the dry dock at high tide without tug assistance

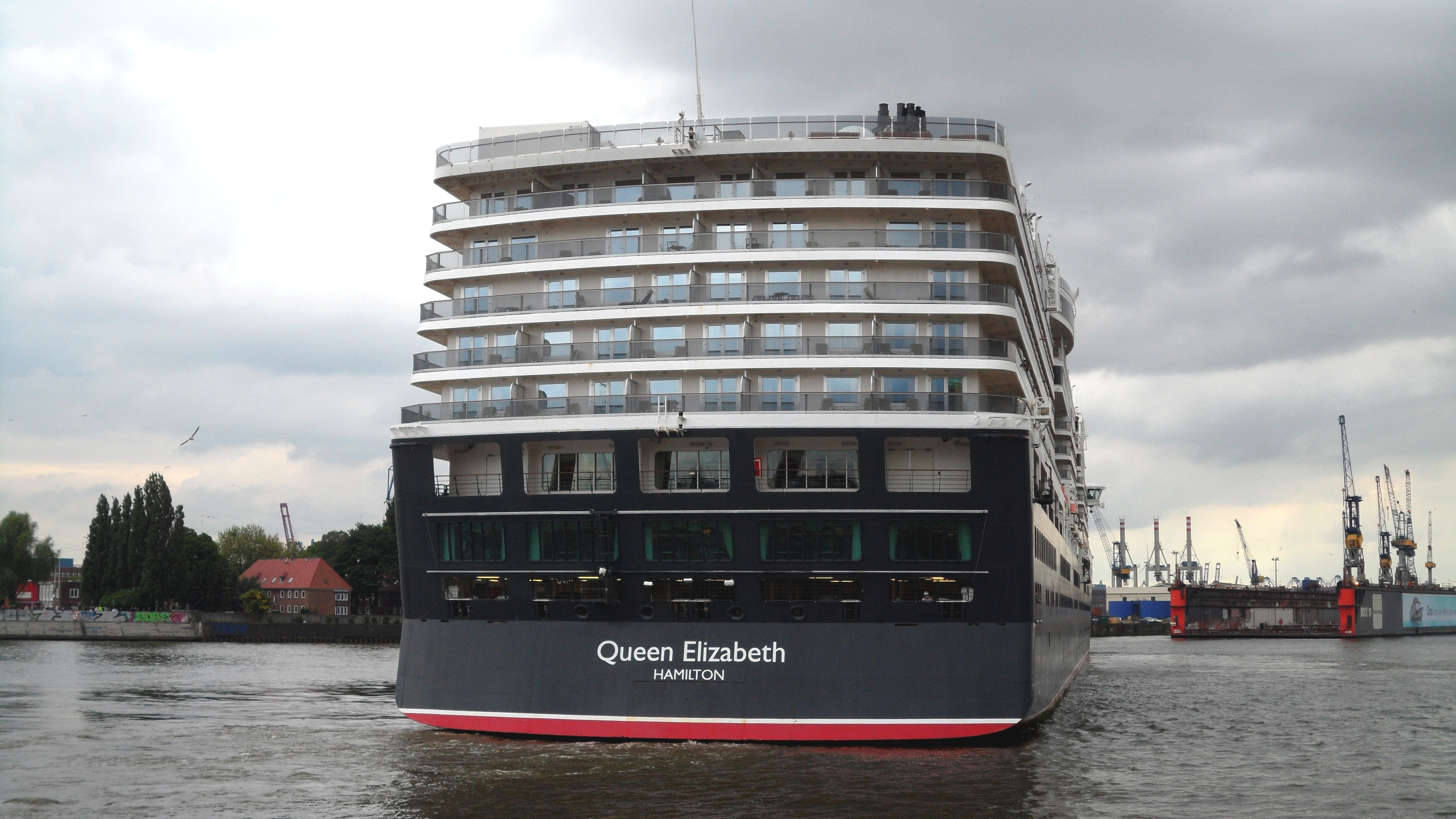
With the help of harbour pilots, its Azipod propulsion, and stern thrusters, the ship moves into the correct position.

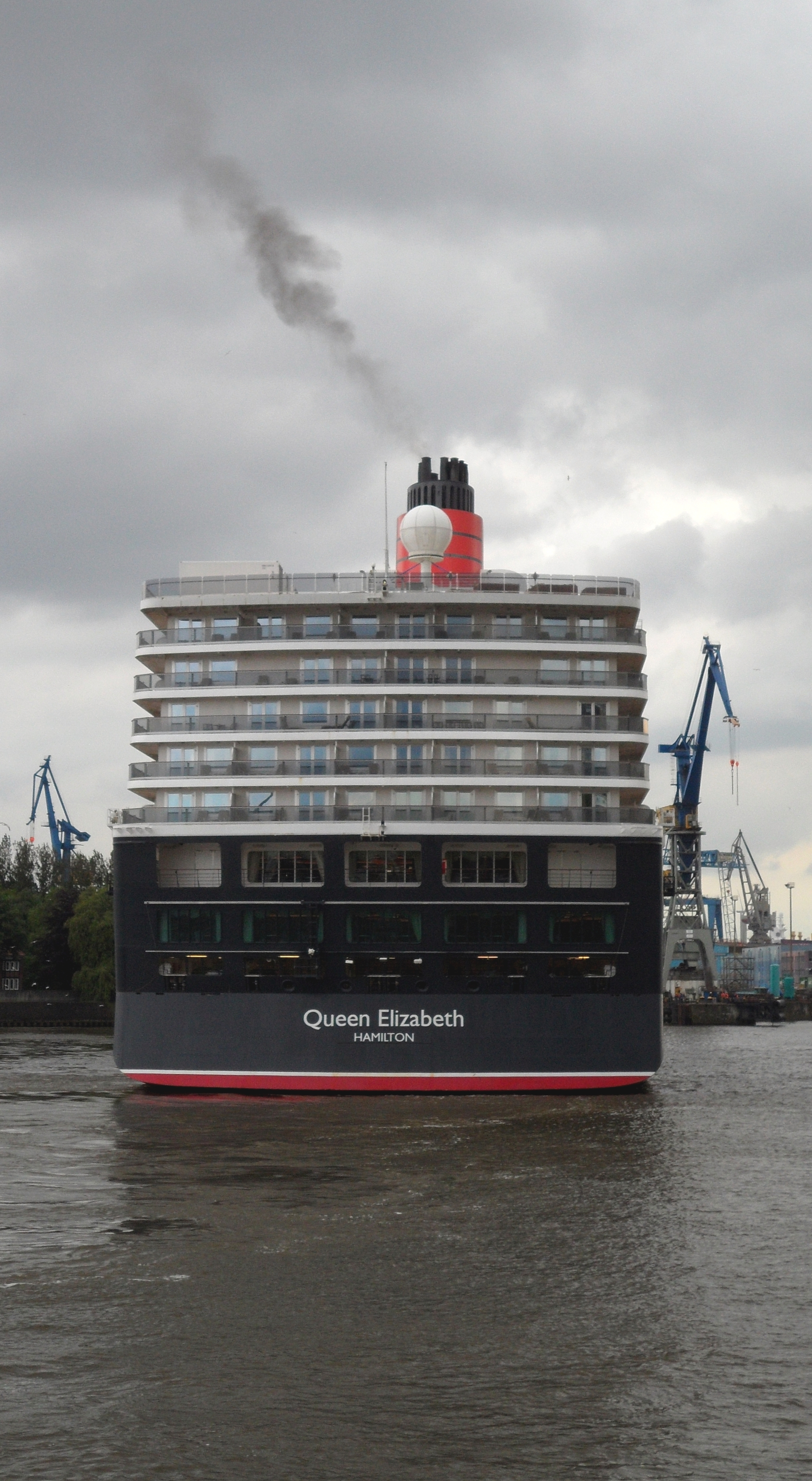
Moving forward very slowly (against the tide), the ship approaches the dry dock.

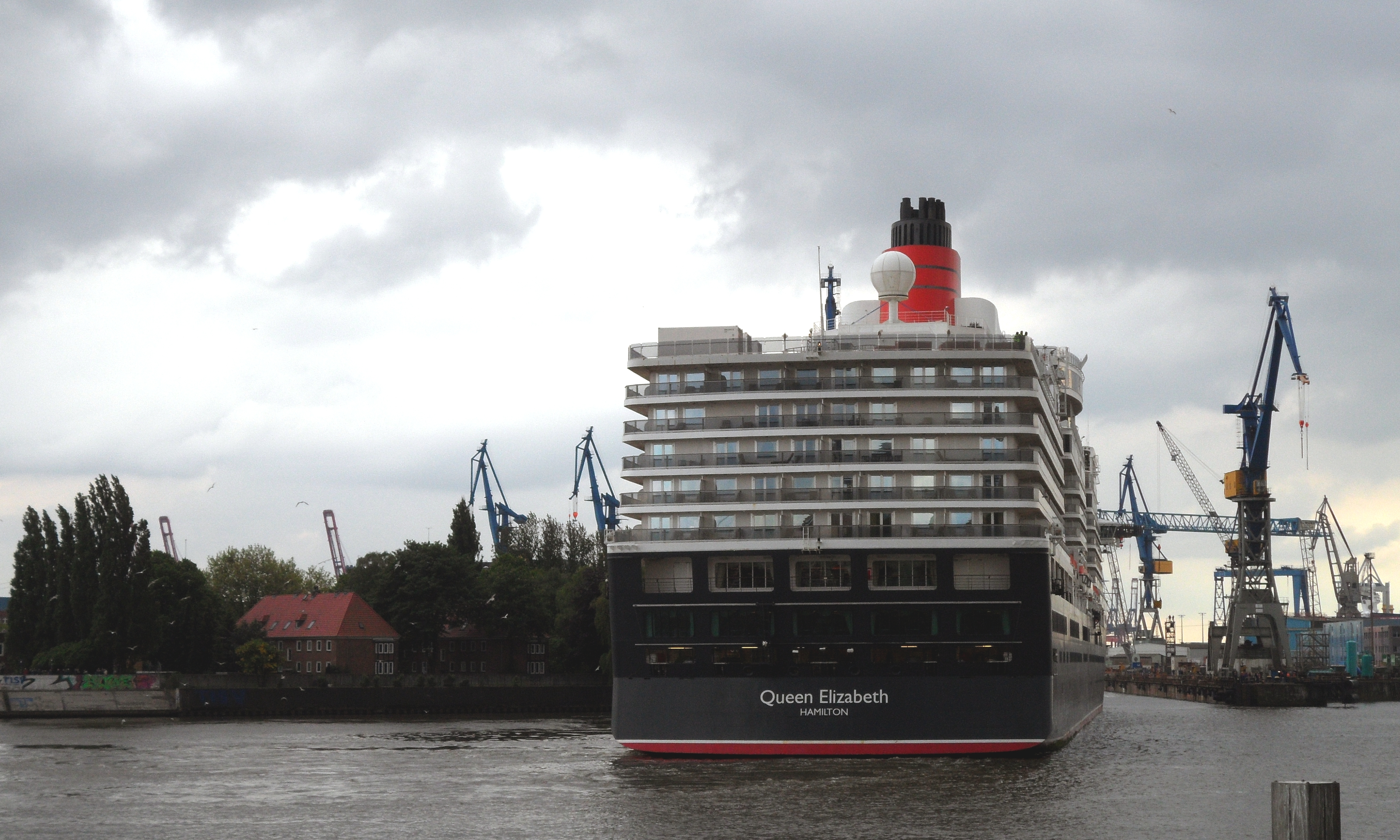
The Azipod system holds the ship in position against a wind from the north-east.

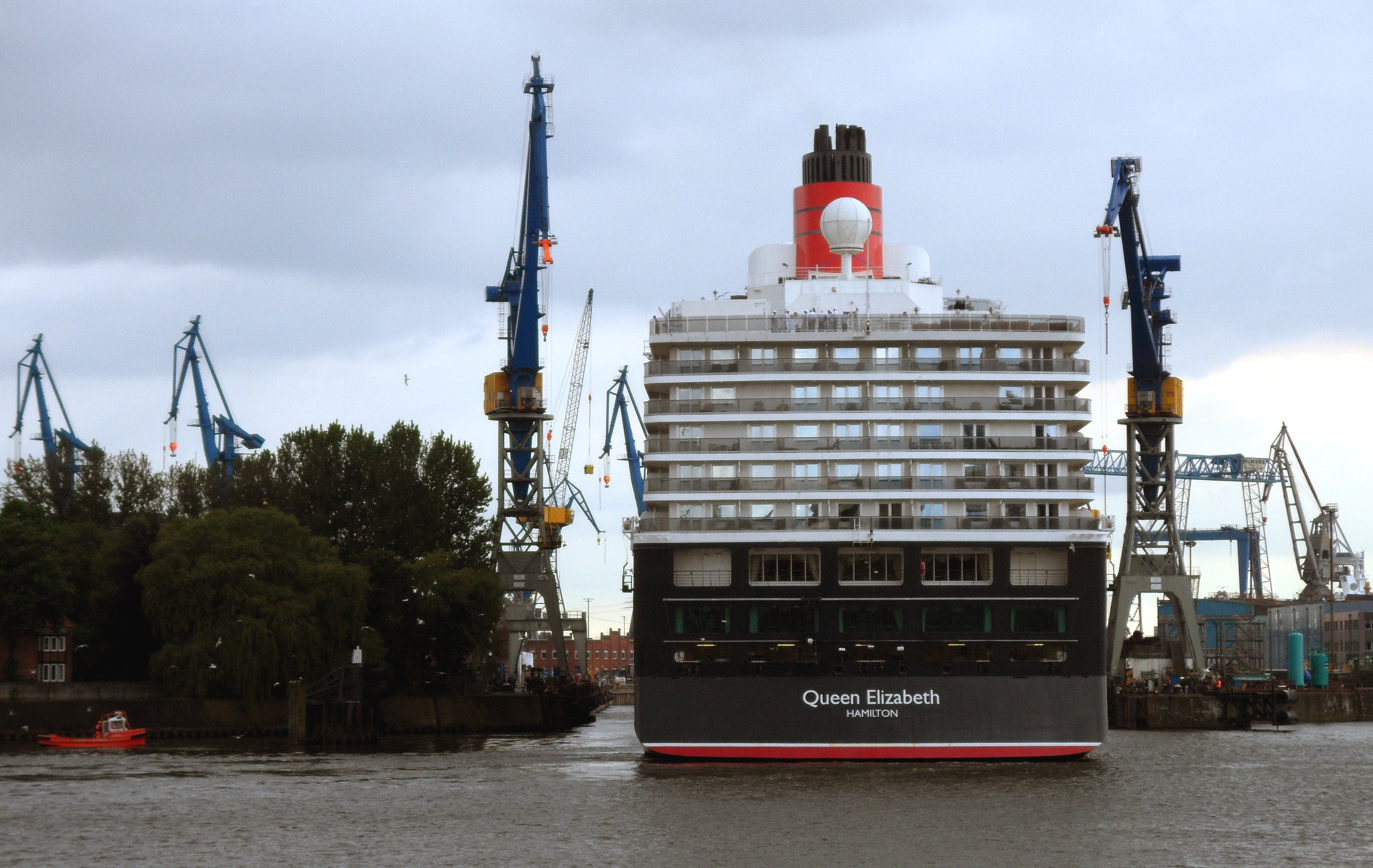
Now the ship is in the correct position and can enter the flooded dock.

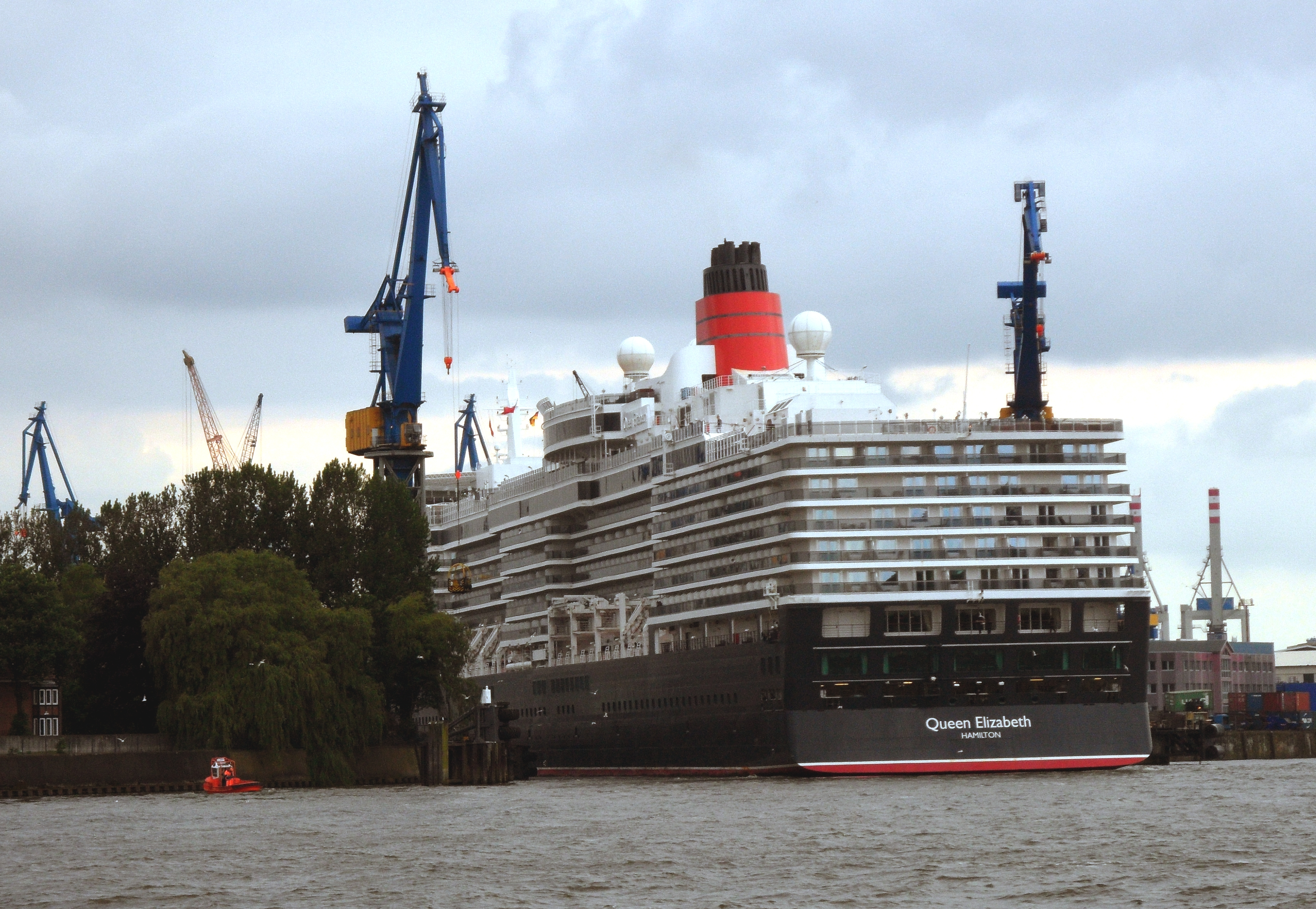
The Queen Elizabeth slowly slides into the dock

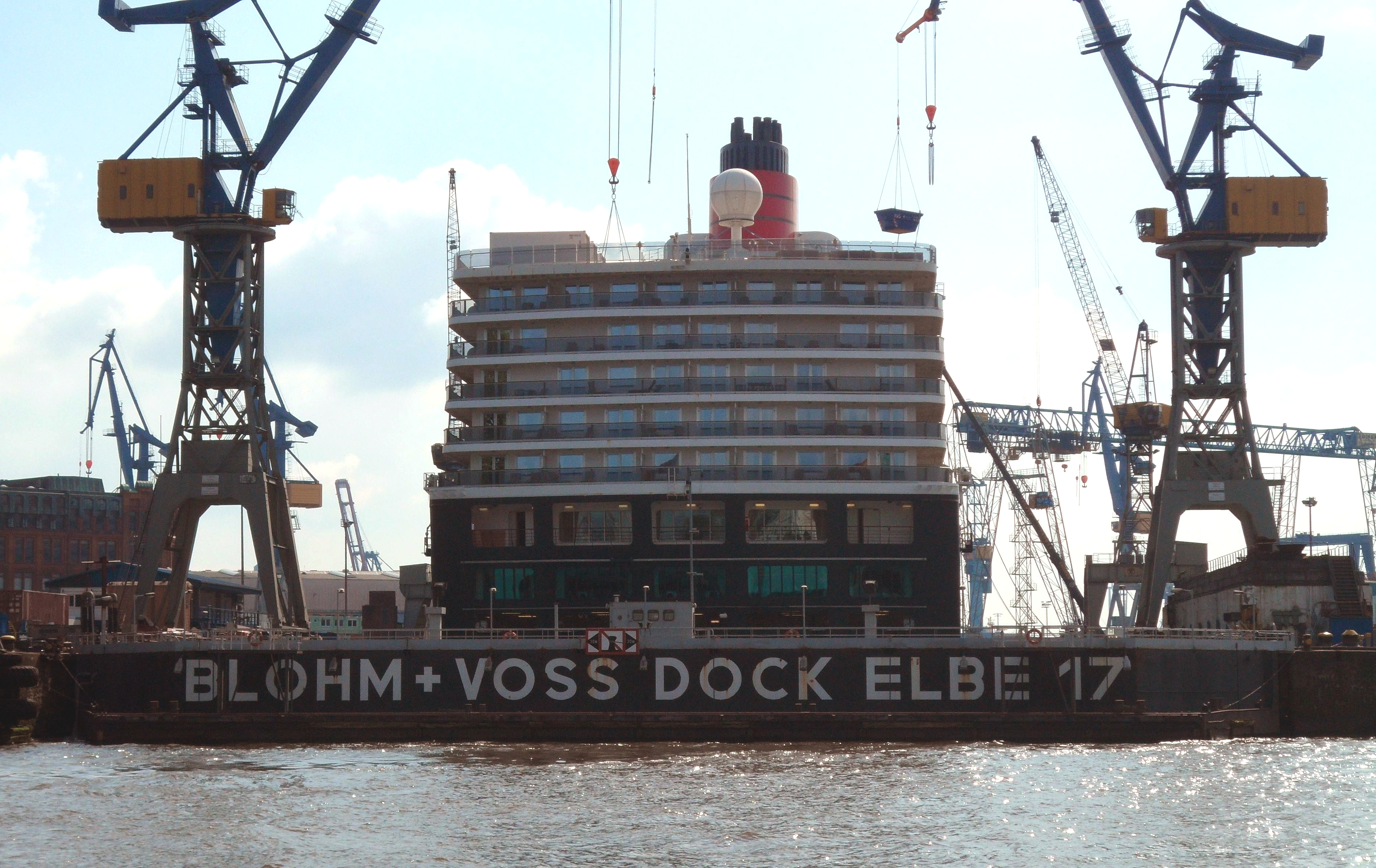
The gate of the dry dock is closed, and maintenance work can begin.
