= Finkenwerder =

- Quarter of Hamburg
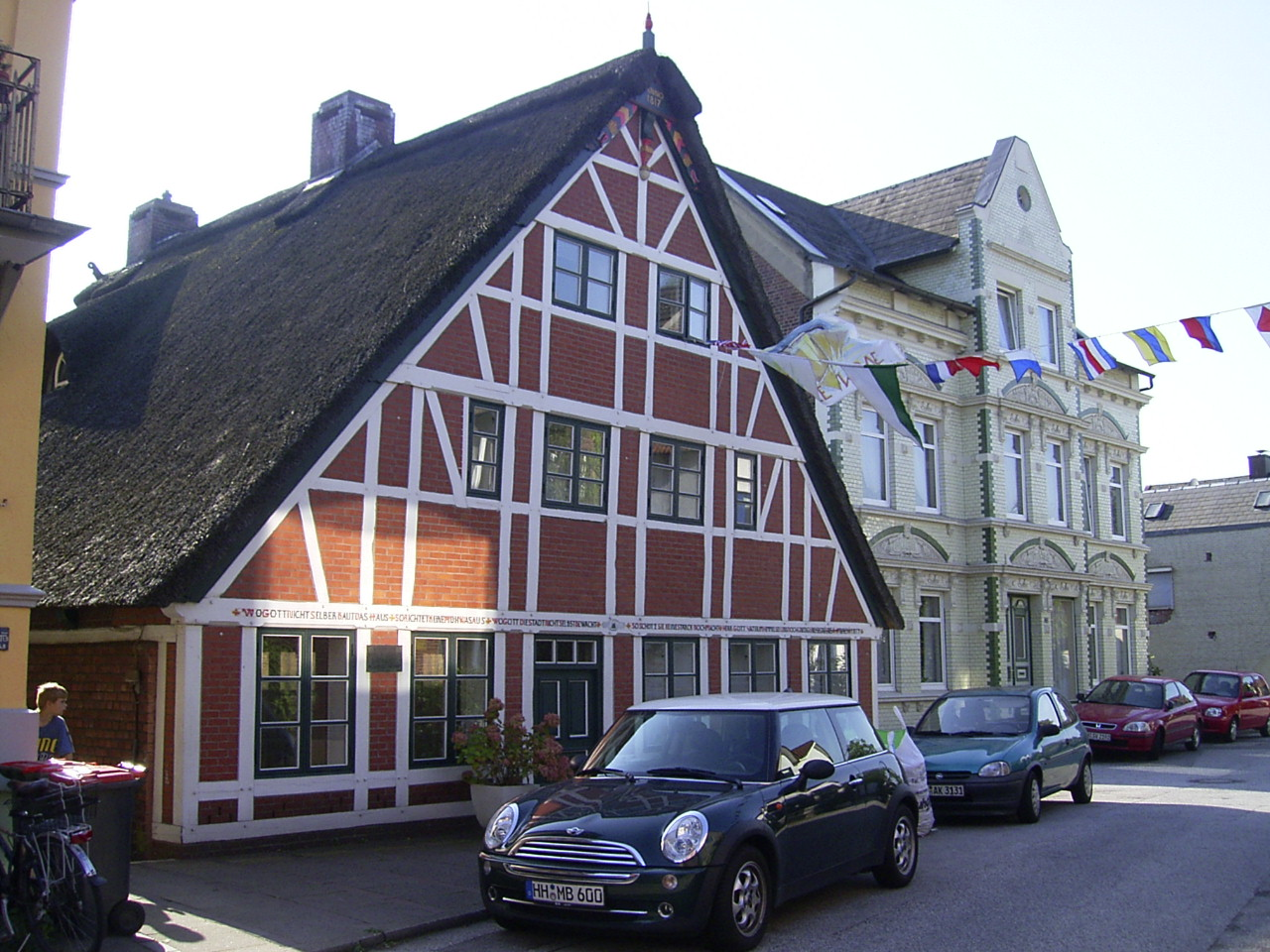
- House (built 1817) at the street Auedeich in Finkenwerder

- Location of Finkenwerder in Hamburg
- Interactive map of Finkenwerder
- Location within Germany Location within Hamburg
- Coordinates: 53°31′37″N 9°51′57″E
- Country: Germany
- State: Hamburg
- City: Hamburg
- Borough: Hamburg-Mitte

Area
  - Total: 19.3 km^{2} (7.5 sq mi)

Population (2024-12-31)
  - Total: 11,662
  - Density: 604/km^{2} (1,560/sq mi)
- Time zone: UTC+01:00 (CET)
  - Summer (DST): UTC+02:00 (CEST)
- Postal codes: 21129
- Dialling codes: 040
- Vehicle registration: HH

Finkenwerder (German pronunciation; Low German: Fink’nwerdā, Finkenwarder or - wärder; German: Finkeninsel; translation: Island of finches) is a quarter of Hamburg, Germany in the borough Hamburg-Mitte. It is the location of the Hamburg Airbus plant and its airport. In 2016 the population was 11,668.

== Geography ==
According to the statistical office of Hamburg and Schleswig-Holstein, the quarter Finkenwerder has a total area of 19.3 km^{2}. Parts of the quarter are covered by the port of Hamburg.

The western and northern border of the quarter are the Elbe river, across it lies the borough of Altona in the north. To the east Finkenwerder is bordered by the Köhlfleet channel, across it lies Waltershof, with which Finkenwerder also shares a small land border in the south-east. To the south and south-west Finkenwerders border runs along the old southern Elbe, across from it lie the quarters of Francop and Neuenfelde, the latter of which Finkenwerder shares another small land border with.

A small officially unnamed and uninhabited island, which is locally referred to as Schweinesand, is officially a part of Finkenwerder and represents its western-most point.

== History ==
Finkenwerder was first mentioned in 1236 (as "Vinkenwerder"). The fishing village became part of Hamburg in 1445, and granted the status of a suburb (Vorort) in 1919.

During World War II until April 30, 1945, a concentration camp was established in Finkenwerder. It was a subcamp to the Neuengamme concentration camp. It was also the site of a U-boat bunker, which was heavily damaged by Tallboy and Grand Slam bombs in April 1945 and demolished post-war, although the foundations of the walls were uncovered during work to extend the runway of Hamburg-Finkenwerder Airport.

== Demographics ==
11,629 people were living in the quarter Finkenwerder in 2006. The population density was 602/km^{2} (1,559/sq mi). 18.9% were children under the age of 18, and 19.8% were 65 years of age or older. 13% were immigrants. 461 people were registered as unemployed and 3,928 were employees subject to social insurance contributions.

In 1999, there were 5,702 households, out of which 25.7% had children under the age of 18 living with them and 39.9% of all households were made up of individuals. The average household size was 2.1.

In 2006, there were 867 criminal offences (75 crimes per 1000 people).

== Politics ==
Finkenwerder is part of the Finkenwerder regional assembly along with the districts of Waltershof and Neuwerk.

The current borough leader of Hamburg-Mitte, Ralf Neubauer (SPD), resides in Finkenwerder and served as its representative in the Hamburg parliament until 10 January 2022. Neubauer was replaced by Jörg Mehldau in parliament, who now represents the district and its constituency.

=== State elections ===
These are the results of Finkenwerder and Waltershof in the Hamburg state elections since 1993:

State Election	SPD	Greens	Left	CDU	AfD	FDP	Others
2020	49,4 %	18,2 %	8,7 %	7,7 %	7,3 %	3,0 %	5,7 %
2015	58,0 %	8,9 %	6,8 %	12,3 %	6,0 %	4,1 %	3,9 %
2011	55,2 %	7,0 %	6,1 %	20,6 %	–	4,4 %	6,6 %
2008	35,7 %	6,3 %	7,2 %	44,7 %	–	3,4 %	2,7 %
2004	35,6 %	9,0 %	–	44,7 %	–	2,2 %	8,5 %
2001	42,4 %	5,3 %	0,2 %	22,7 %	–	3,6 %	25,8 %
1997	43,6 %	9,9 %	0,5 %	28,1 %	–	2,3 %	15,6 %
1993	47,0 %	10,8 %	–	22,0 %	–	3,6 %	16,6 %

== Economy ==
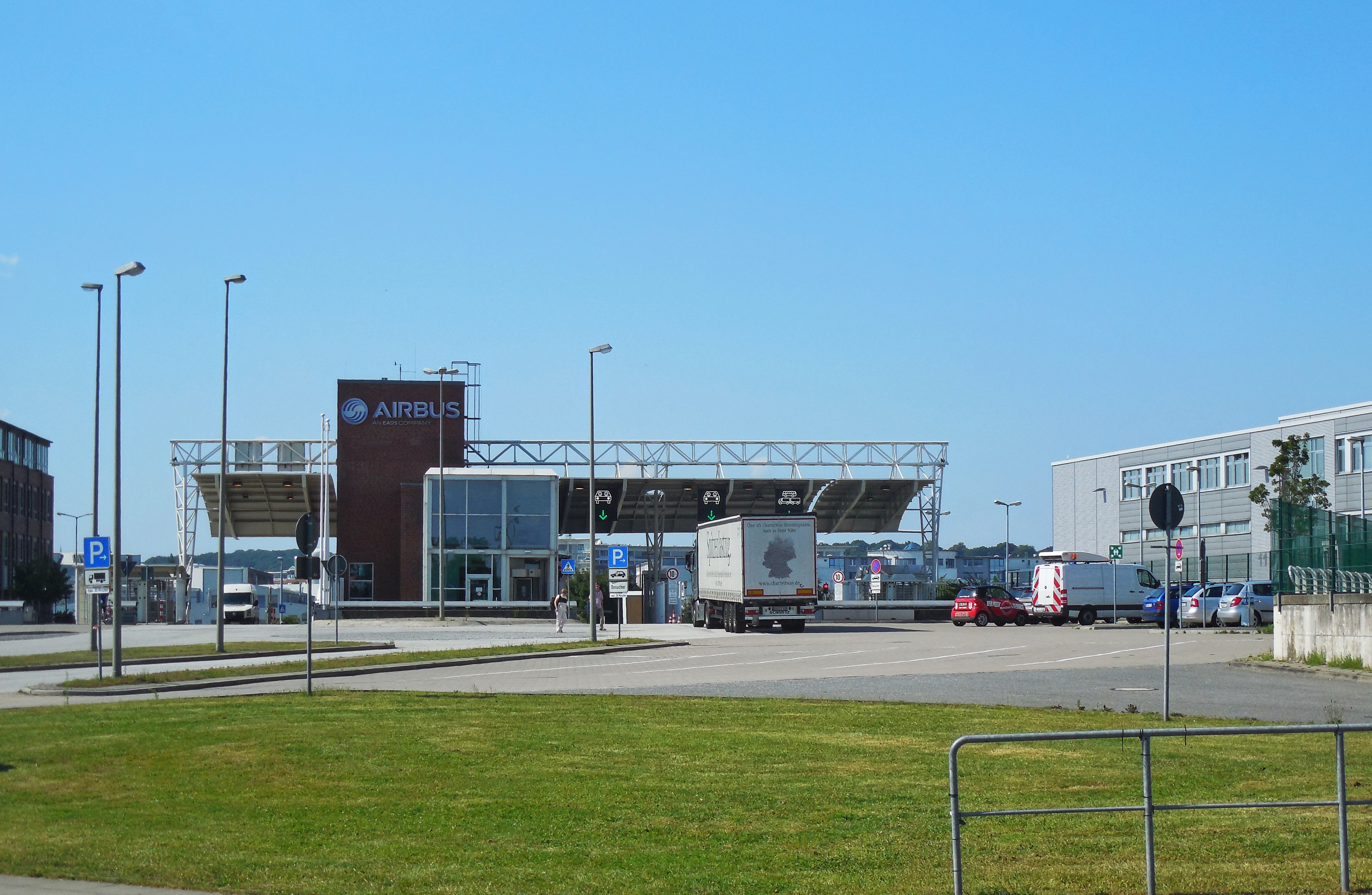
Entrance of the Airbus plant in Finkenwerder

Finkenwerder is divided into an industrial and rural area. The Airbus Hamburg-Finkenwerder manufacturing plant and associated airfield, as well as some facilities of the port of Hamburg are located in this quarter.

== Infrastructure ==
=== Healthcare ===
As of 2006 Finkenwerder had six day-care centers for children, seven physicians in private practice, and three pharmacies.

=== Education ===
There are two elementary (Westerschule & Aueschule Finkenwerder) as well as two secondary schools (Stadtteilschule & Gymnasium Finkenwerder) in the quarter.

=== Transportation ===
The quarter is not serviced by the rapid rail transit system of Hamburg. Public transport is provided via buses of the HVV and two ferry lines on the Elbe River operated by HADAG.

According to the Department of Motor Vehicles (Kraftfahrt-Bundesamt), 4,354 private cars were registered in Finkenwerder (376 cars/1000 people). There were 58 traffic accidents total, including 45 traffic accidents with damage to persons.

== See also ==
- List of subcamps of Neuengamme
- Hamburg Finkenwerder Airport
- Hamburger Flugzeugbau

== Notes ==
=== References ===
- Official German list of concentration camps Verzeichnis der Konzentrationslager und ihrer Außenkommandos gemäß § 42 Abs. 2 BEG (in German)
- Statistical office Hamburg and Schleswig-Holstein Statistisches Amt für Hamburg und Schleswig-Holstein, official website (in German)
