= Dietrich Wersich =

German politician (born 1964)

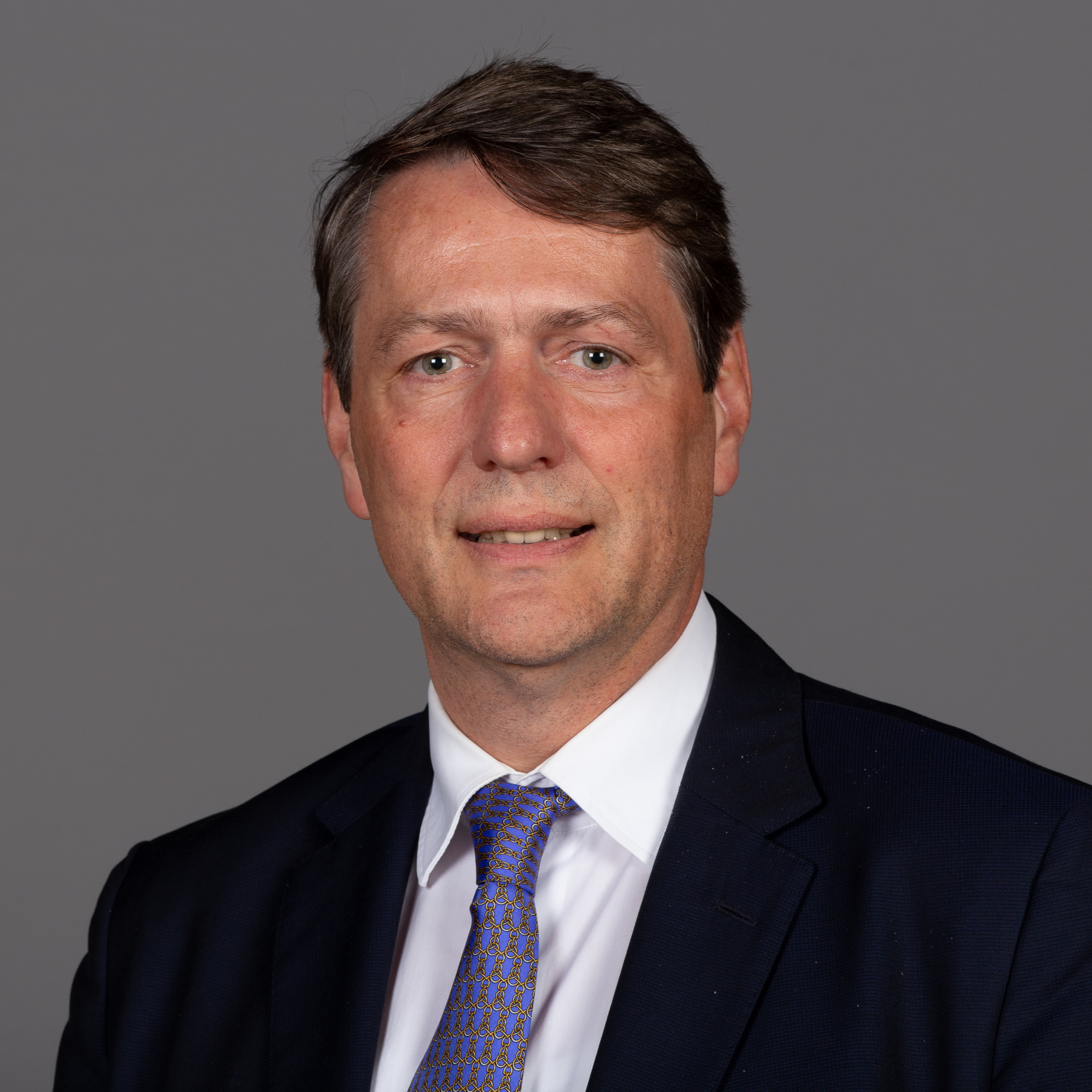

Hamburg State Minister of Social Affairs, Family Affairs, Health and Consumer Protection
- In office May 7, 2008 – March 7, 2011
- Preceded by: Birgit Schnieber-Jastram
- Succeeded by: Detlef Scheele

121st Vice Mayor of Hamburg
- In office November 30, 2010 – March 7, 2011
- Preceded by: Christa Goetsch
- Succeeded by: Dorothee Stapelfeldt

Personal details
- Born: April 27, 1964 (age 62) Hamburg
- Party: CDU

Dietrich Wersich (born April 27, 1964) is a German politician of the German Christian Democratic Union (CDU), and physician. Since March 7, 2011 he is chairman of the CDU parliamentary Group in the Hamburg state legislature (Hamburgische Bürgerschaft), the largest opposition party. From May 7, 2008 to March 7, 2011 he was Hamburg State Minister of Social Affairs, Family Affairs, Health and Consumer Protection. From November 29, 2010 to March 7, 2011 he was also Deputy Mayor of Hamburg.

== Early life and career ==
After receiving the Abitur at Gelehrtenschule des Johanneums in 1984, he completed the "Grundwehrdienst".

From 1986 to 1992, Wersich studied medicine at University of Hamburg and subsequently worked as a physician for Internal medicine, Geriatrics and Gerontology at AK Ochsenzoll hospital and Bethanien hospital until 1999. From 2000 to 2002, he continued his medical work in a private practice.

During his work as a physician, Wersich founded a theater production company for the Altonaer Theater, STAITSCH TeaterbetriebsGmbH, for which he acted as managing partner until 2004. Since 2003, his company also works for Hamburger Kammerspiele and Harburger Theater.

== Political career ==
Since 2008, Wersich held various local positions in the Hamburg CDU. He was also a member of the Bezirksversammlung Hamburg-Nord (Stadtbezirk-legislature) and, since 2004, a member of the board of the Hamburg state CDU. From 1997 to 2004 and since 2011 he is a member of the Hamburgische Bürgerschaft.

On April 1, 2004, Wersich became a member of the Senat der Freien und Hansestadt Hamburg as state secretary under Ole von Beust. Until April 30, 2006, he was state secretary for health, before becoming state secretary in the newly formed Ministry of Social Affairs, Family Affairs, Health and Consumer Protection on May 1, 2006. On May 7, 2008, he was named Hamburg State Minister of Social Affairs, Family Affairs, Health and Consumer Protection of the new CDU/Green Alternative List (GAL) coalition government. Following the cancellation of the coalition by the GAL, all GAL ministers were discharged and their positions given to the remaining CDU ministers on November 30, 2010. Wersich became acting Minister of Schools and Vocational Training as well as Deputy Mayor of Hamburg until he was replaced on March 7, 2011 by Dorothee Stapelfeldt of the Social Democratic Party (SPD) following the February 20 Hamburg state election.

On March 7, 2011, Wersich was elected chairman of the CDU parliamentary group in the Hamburg state legislature (Hamburgischer Bürgerschaft), thus becoming the leader of the largest opposition party.

== Other activities ==
- Infinitas Kay-Stiftung, Member of the Board of Trustees
- Erich Quenzel Foundation, Member of the Board of Trustees
- Hamburg Symphony Orchestra, Member of the Advisory Board
- Academy of World Religions (AWR) at the University of Hamburg, Member of the Advisory Board
- Übersee Club, Member of the Board of Trustees

== Personal life ==
One of Wersichs four brothers is the former member of the Hamburgische Bürgerschaft, CDU-politician Ekkehart Wersich. Wersich lives with his partner in Hamburg.
