= Christoph Ahlhaus =

German politician (born 1969)

Christoph Ahlhaus MdHB a. D. Senator a. D. MdBR a. D.
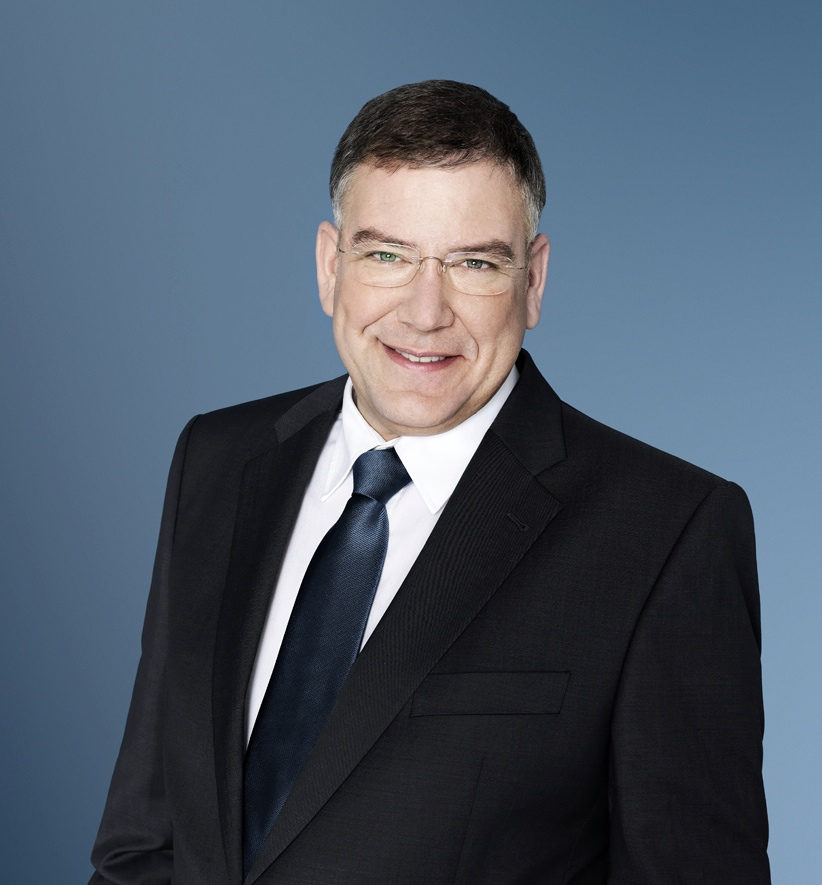

First Mayor of Hamburg
- In office 25 August 2010 – 7 March 2011
- Second Mayor: Christa Goetsch; Dietrich Wersich
- Preceded by: Ole von Beust
- Succeeded by: Olaf Scholz

Senator for the Interior of Hamburg
- In office 7 May 2008 – 25 August 2010
- First Mayor: Ole von Beust
- Preceded by: Udo Nagel
- Succeeded by: Heino Vahldieck

Member of the Hamburg Parliament
- In office 7 March 2011 – 10 November 2014
- Preceded by: multi-member district
- Succeeded by: Harald Krüger
- Constituency: Christian Democratic Union list
- In office 17 March 2004 – 31 March 2006
- Preceded by: multi-member district
- Succeeded by: Herbert Winter
- Constituency: Christian Democratic Union list

Personal details
- Born: 28 August 1969 (age 57) Heidelberg, West Germany
- Party: CDU
- Spouse: Simone Ahlhaus (m. 2006)
- Education: Heidelberg University; Free University of Berlin; LMU Munich
- Occupation: Politician; Lawyer

Christoph Ahlhaus (born 28 August 1969) is a German politician. He is a representative of the German Christian Democratic Union which he joined in 1985. He was the mayor of Hamburg from August 2010 to March 2011.

== Personal life ==
Ahlhaus was born on 28 August 1969 in Heidelberg, Baden-Württemberg, where he grew up. From 1988 to 1990 he completed an apprenticeship for banking, and from that same year went on to study law at Heidelberg University, LMU Munich, the Free University of Berlin, and the German University of Administrative Sciences Speyer. In 1998 he did a clerkship, with a station at the German University of Administrative Sciences in Speyer. In 1999, he qualified as an attorney.

Since May 2006, he has been married to Simone Ahlhaus (née Götz).

Ahlhaus was a member of the fraternity Turnerschaft Ghibellinia zu Heidelberg.

In the summer of 2014, Ahlhaus moved with his family to Berlin. There, he works as a lawyer in a law firm.

== Politics in the CDU ==
Christoph Ahlhaus, who represented the CDU from 1985, was Chairman of the municipality association of Heidelberg-Altstadt-Schlierbach and Deputy Chairman of the District Association of Heidelberg until 2001. From 2001 to 2006, he was the regional secretary of the CDU in Hamburg. From March 2004 to March 2006, he was a member of the Parliament of the Free and Hanseatic City of Hamburg, as part of the legal and home affairs committees. Until June 2012, he was the Chairman of the CDU in Hamburg-Nord.

== Member of the Hamburg Senate ==
In April 2006, Mayor Ole von Beust appointed him as state councilor of the Department of Sport and Home Affairs. On 7 May 2008, Ahlhaus replaced Udo Nagel and became the Home affairs senator of the Free and Hanseatic City of Hamburg.

In September 2009, without having informed his party beforehand, Ahlhaus planned to reduce the casino tax in Hamburg from 90% to 50%. This would have allowed the casinos to save approximately 30 million euros in taxes up to 2010. A scandalous fact was that John Jahr Jr. (from Gruner & Jahr) was one of the bosses of the casino, as well as the co-founder of the real-estate company in which Ahlhaus' wife had led their license marketing since 2009.

Also criticised was the use of state-funded money for paying towards his villa and second home in Altona (which cost around 1.2 million Euros).

In the "company car affair", he had to make an additional payment of EUR 59.40 for private car use.

Ahlhaus continued despite tight budgets in 2010 through the acquisition of a riding squad with a total investment of approximately €600,000 and annual operating costs of €200,000. Under Interior Minister Michael Neumann (SPD) entertainment contracts are to be closed by 2015. His desire to hold on to the continued existence of the police orchestra, with an annual cost of 1.5 million euros, was in some part because of a lack of understanding, despite his cuts in the cultural department. His successor Scholz upholds this tradition.

== First Mayor of the Free and Hanseatic City of Hamburg ==
On 18 July 2010, Beust announced his resignation as mayor of Hamburg, so he could devote more time to his personal life. His recommendation to nominate Christoph Ahlhaus as his successor was unanimously followed by Hamburg's CDU Regional Executive. The election of the First Mayor of the CDU-Green Senate majority was fixed for the first meeting of the citizenry after the parliamentary summer recess on 25 August 2010. However, the coalition partners GAL initially reacted skeptically to the nomination of Christoph Ahlhaus. They called on the conservative hardliner politicians to follow Beust's liberal route and to abide by the coalition agreement. Ahlhaus put himself firmly behind the agreement between the CDU and GAL, which had existed since 2008, and also expressed his readiness to face the Green base in August 2010. After the meeting with the basis of the GAL on 18 August, both Ahlhaus and representatives of the GAL expressed confidence in being able to continue the CDU-Green coalition. The Green Youth party demanded an exit from the coalition.

Ahead of the planned election Ahlhaus' membership in the Turnerschaft Ghibellinia was made public. This triggered anger in the GAL, and leaders of the party put the support of their faction in the election for the Lord Mayor in question. They demanded Ahlhaus' clarification about his relations with the Turnerschaft and complained that in their view, nationalist tendencies and misogynistic principles are present in connections with the Coburg Convents. Ahlhaus stated that he had not had contact with the Heidelberg Turnerschaft for years. He had asked the chairman of the fraternity to no longer consider him a member.

When choosing the First Mayor on 25 August 2010 it came in spite of previous disputes as a surprise. Christoph Ahlhaus received 70 votes in favor on the first ballot, two votes more than the black-green coalition MPs managed. Citizenship MPs of the opposition from both the SPD and the Left had also voted for Ahlhaus. 50 MPs voted against him, and one abstained.

== Election and term of office ==
On 28 November 2010, both the GAL parliamentary group, the GAL Senators and the State Executive Committee of the GAL decided to end the coalition, prompting Ahlhaus to order the dismissal of the GAL senators and state councilors on 29 November 2010. Since then, Ahlhaus has led a CDU minority government.
