= Mario Mettbach =

German politician

Mario Mettbach MdHB a. D. Senator a. D. MdBR a. D.

Second Mayor of Hamburg
- In office 19 August 2003 – 17 March 2004
- First Mayor: Ole von Beust
- Preceded by: Ronald Schill
- Succeeded by: Birgit Schnieber-Jastram

Senator of Construction and Transport of Hamburg
- In office 31 October 2001 – 17 March 2004
- First Mayor: Ole von Beust
- Preceded by: Eugen Wagner (Construction)
- Succeeded by: Michael Freytag (Urban Development and the Environment)

Chairman of the Party for a Rule of Law Offensive
- In office 6 December 2003 – February 2004
- Preceded by: Ronald Schill
- Succeeded by: Markus Wagner

Member of the Hamburg Parliament
- In office 10 October 2001 – 17 March 2004
- Preceded by: multi-member district
- Succeeded by: multi-member district
- Constituency: Party for a Rule of Law Offensive List

Personal details
- Born: 24 July 1952 Hamburg, West Germany (now Germany)
- Died: 2021 or 2022 (aged 69)
- Party: CDU (1980–1993; 2005–)
- Other political affiliations: Party for a Rule of Law Offensive (2000–2004); Statt Party (1993–1998)
- Education: Fachschule des Heeres für Erziehung und Wirtschaft

Mario Mettbach (24 July 1952 – 2021 or 2022) was a German politician from Hamburg and a representative of the Christian Democratic Union (CDU) and the Party for a Rule of Law Offensive.

== Biography ==
Mettbach was born on 24 July 1952 in Hamburg. After his apprenticeship as a shipping clerk (1967–70), Mettbach joined the German army in 1974 and studied business management at the German army economy college in Darmstadt (1980–82).

Mettbach began his political career in the CDU which he joined in 1980. He was founding member of the Statt Party in 1993 and later joined the Law and Order Offensive Party of Ronald Schill.

From August 2001 to March 2004, he was the senator (equivalent of a minister) of construction and transport, and additionally Second Mayor of Hamburg from August 2003 to March 2004, replacing his dismissed party leader Schill. Mettbach was criticised for appointing his domestic partner as his personal assistant, arguing that he would not trust a stranger in this position. In Spring 2003, Mettbach was elected federal chairman of the Party for a Rule of Law Offensive, succeeding Schill, who continued to be leader of the Hamburg state party. In December 2003 the party split when the federal board (chaired by Mettbach) removed Schill from his position as chairman of the state party and later even expelled him from the party.

After losing the election in 2004, Mettbach abandoned the Party for a Rule of Law Offensive and returned to the CDU in March 2005. He worked as a management consultant and was on the supervisory board of the Hamburg Port Authority. In Spring 2006 the state-owned Hamburg business development corporation HFW hired him as a consultant. The opposition attributed his choice to his political links. He had to relinquish this mandate in May of the same year, when connections to a criminal businessman became public. In 2007, he attempted suicide.

On 1 April 2022, the Senate of Hamburg announced that Mettbach had died at the age of 69.
