= Birgit Schnieber-Jastram =

German politician (born 1946)

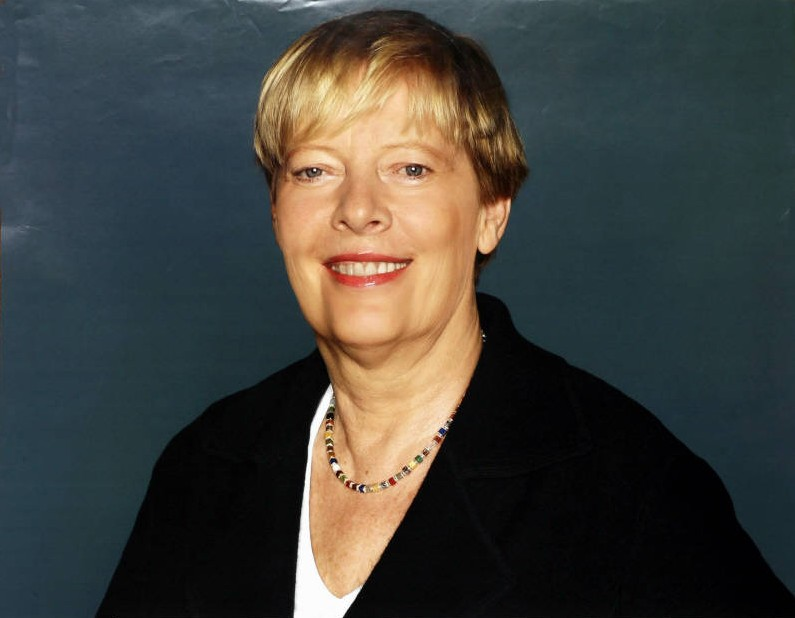
- Birgit Schnieber-Jastram (2008)

Hamburg State Minister for Social and Family Affairs
- In office 2001–2008
- Succeeded by: Dietrich Wersich

Second Mayor of the Free and Hanseatic city of Hamburg
- In office 2004–2008
- Preceded by: Mario Mettbach
- Succeeded by: Christa Goetsch

Personal details
- Born: 4 July 1946 (age 79) Hamburg
- Party: CDU

Birgit Schnieber-Jastram (born 4 July 1946 in Hamburg) is a German politician and representative of the Christian Democratic Union of Germany.

== Biography ==
She attended several schools in Hamburg (1953–1966), worked as a woman editor, and is married with 2 children.

Since 1981, Schnieber-Jastram has been a member of the CDU. From 1986 to 1994 she was a member of the Hamburg Parliament and a member of the Bundestag from 1994 to 2001, including serving as a parliamentary executive of the CDU faction (2000–2001) and in this position a member of the council of elders. From October 2001 to May 2008, she was State Minister for Social and Family Affairs of Hamburg. She was succeeded by Dietrich Wersich. In her position as Senator, she was Second Mayor of Hamburg, from March 2004—after the election of 2004—until May 2008.

In 2009 Schnieber-Jastram was elected to the European Parliament. After her election, Schnieber-Jastram was criticised, among others, by the magazine Der Spiegel, for collecting a pension for her job as Hamburg Senator (€5,500) and receiving monthly €7,665 for her election as MEP. The Hamburg Government announced plans to change its law, to prevent double income.
