= Party for a Rule of Law Offensive =

Party for a Rule of Law Offensive Partei Rechtsstaatlicher Offensive
- Leader: Ronald Schill (2000–2003); Mario Mettbach (2003–2004); Markus Wagner (2004–2006); Peter-Alexander von der Marwitz (2006–2007); Wolfgang Jabbusch (2007)
- Founded: 13 July 2000
- Dissolved: 29 October 2007
- Succeeded by: Citizens in Rage (Bremen section)
- Ideology: Right-wing populism Conservatism; Law and order
- Political position: Right-wing

Website
- schill-partei.de (archive)

The Party for a Rule of Law Offensive, Rule of Law State Offensive Party, Party for the Promotion of the Rule of Law, Law and Order Offensive Party, or Party of Law and Order Offensive (German: Partei Rechtsstaatlicher Offensive), (Note: Rechtsstaat is each a translation of a German legal concept, that is closely related to but not fully identical to the rule of law.) commonly known as the "Schill party" from 2000 to 2003, was a minor right-wing populist party in Germany, mainly active in the state of Hamburg, that ran on a platform of law and order. It was founded in July 2000 by the judge Ronald Schill and was temporarily very successful in Hamburg, winning 19.4% of the votes in the 2001 state election and joining a coalition government. After the centre-right coalition collapsed and Schill left the party in 2003, it quickly lost support. Attempts to expand to other states or the federal level were unsuccessful. It may therefore be considered a "flash party" or protest party.

== Name ==
Initially it used the acronym PRO but had to drop it after a judicial complaint by the Pro Deutsche Mitte (Pro DM) party, as it was considered too similar to the latter's short name. Because of this, the official short name was "Schill", derived from the informal, but commonly used epithet Schill-Partei ("Schill party") from 2001 to 2004. After Schill's resignation, the party had to choose yet another short name, now running as Offensive D, the "D" standing for Deutschland ("Germany").

== History ==
=== Inception ===
Before his political career, Ronald Schill had been a criminal judge at the Hamburg district court. He was known in the local tabloid press for passing unusually severe sentences and advocating harsher penalties, especially for adolescent delinquents, winning the nickname of "Judge Merciless". Schill supporters launched a political initiative in late 1999 and registered the Party for a Rule of Law Offensive in July 2000. The party platform and public appearance was strongly focused on the personality of its founder.

=== Schill era (2000–03) ===
In the 2001 Hamburg state parliament elections it instantly came third and received 19.4% of votes (only 7 points behind the major conservative CDU) and 25 of the 121 seats in the assembly. During the campaign, it had accused the state government of insufficient action against criminality, drugs, violence, demanding more police and tougher sanctions. It benefitted from a general feeling of insecurity that had spread after the September 11 attacks in the United States, especially given that three of the terrorists had lived and studied in Hamburg. After the election, the new party joined a centre-right coalition with the CDU and the liberal FDP. The Schill party had 3 out of 11 senators (equivalent to ministers), with Ronald Schill being deputy mayor and senator of the interior.

The party could not extend its success to other states: In the state elections of Sachsen-Anhalt 2002 and Bremen 2003, it won 4.4% and 4.5% of the votes respectively, but failed to surmount the 5% threshold for parliamentary representation. In other states it only polled around 1%. In the 2002 federal election, the Schill party won only 0.8% of the votes. In Spring 2003, Mario Mettbach was elected federal chairman of the party, while Schill continued to lead the Hamburg state branch. After a dispute about Schill's state secretary, Hamburg's first mayor Ole von Beust (CDU) removed Schill from his government office, accusing him of blackmail. Purportedly, Schill had threatened to accuse von Beust of granting undue advantages to the senator of justice, with whom Schill suspected von Beust of having a love affair.

In December 2003, the federal board of the party removed Schill from his position as chairman of the state party. Schill considered this illegal and ignored the decision, therefore the federal board decided to expel Schill from the party. Consequently, the party's parliamentary group split, the supporters of Schill leaving the party's group and founding a separate one. Von Beust canceled the coalition and called a snap election.

=== After Schill (2004–07) ===
In the 2004 Hamburg elections, the party under the new leader Mario Mettbach only reached 0.4% and lost all of its seats, while Schill ran on a joint ticket with the Pro DM party, winning 3.1% of the votes, but also failing to qualify for parliamentary representation. After the election, Mettbach and most of the other members left the party, some of them joining the CDU. The members who hadn't left elected a new leader and changed their short name to Offensive D. Under that name, they came in last at the 2005 German federal election, polling 3,338 out of over 47 million votes (less than 0.01%).

The party dissolved due to poor election results and financial problems in September 2007, having lost several leading figures and entire state groups to other right-wing parties such as the Centre Party.

== Election results ==
=== Bürgerschaft of Hamburg ===
Election	Popular Vote		Seats	+/–	Government
Election	Votes	%	Seats	+/–	Government
2001	165,421	19.4 (#3)	25 / 121		CDU-PRO-FDP
2004	3,046	0.4 (#8)	0 / 121	▼25	No seats

== Logos ==
2000–2001

2001–2004
