= Karin von Welck =

German politician

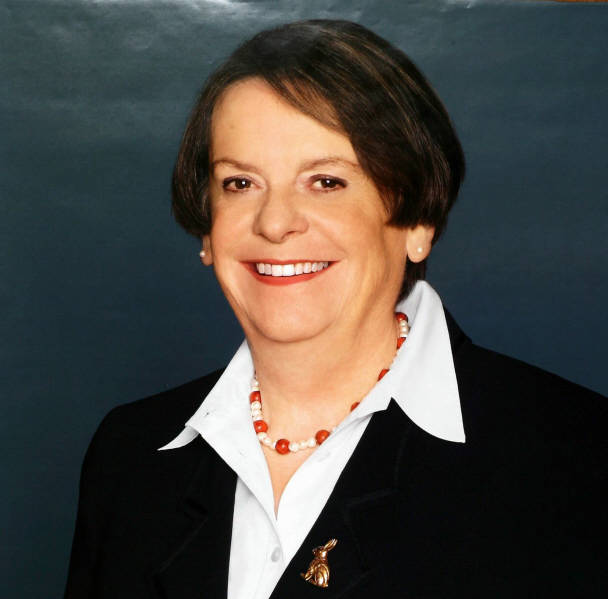
Karin von Welck (2006)

Karin von Welck (born 30 April 1947 in Buir, North Rhine-Westphalia) is an anthropologist. She been Cultural Senator of the city state of Hamburg since 2004. Welck is an independent.

== Works ==
Welck graduated in 1966 in politics, ethnology, Germanistics, ancient American languages and culture, ethnology, and linguistics from the Universities of Hamburg and Köln. In 1973, she took her doctorate with the work Untersuchungen zum sogenannten Konservatismus der Pueblo-Indianer in Arizona und Neu Mexiko. After that, she worked as a research assistant at the Institute of Ethnology at the University of Köln, and worked with a number of museums. In 1979, she returned to the institute and took over the leadership of the Indonesia department of the Rautenstrauch-Joest-Museum in Köln. From 1982, she was vice-director of the same museum. In 1990, she became director of the Reiss-Museum in Mannheim, and from 1998 to 2004, she was general secretary of the German States' Culture Committee. She was named honorary professor at the University of Mannheim in 1994.

== Other works ==
17 March 2004 - named Cultural Senator in Ole von Beust's Senate in Hamburg.
