= Ronald Schill =

German lawyer and politician

Ronald Schill MdHB a. D. Senator a. D. MdBR a. D.

Second Mayor of Hamburg
- In office 31 October 2001 – 19 August 2003
- First Mayor: Ole von Beust
- Preceded by: Krista Sager
- Succeeded by: Mario Mettbach

Senator for the Interior of Hamburg
- In office 31 October 2001 – 19 August 2003
- First Mayor: Ole von Beust
- Preceded by: Olaf Scholz
- Succeeded by: Dirk Nockemann

Leader of the Party for a Rule of Law Offensive in Hamburg
- In office 13 July 2000 – 6 December 2003
- Preceded by: Position established
- Succeeded by: Mario Mettbach

Member of the Hamburg Parliament
- In office 10 October 2001 – 17 March 2004
- Preceded by: multi-member district
- Succeeded by: multi-member district
- Constituency: Party for a Rule of Law Offensive List

Judge of the District Court of Hamburg
- In office 1993–2001

Personal details
- Born: 23 November 1958 (age 67) Hamburg, West Germany
- Party: Independent
- Other political affiliations: Pro DM (2004–2007); Party for a Rule of Law Offensive (2000–2003)
- Education: University of Hamburg

Ronald Barnabas Schill (born 23 November 1958) is a former German judge, the founder of the German political parties Party for a Rule of Law Offensive (Partei Rechtsstaatlicher Offensive; also called PRO or "Schill party") and Pro DM/Schill. He served as the Senator of the Interior and Second Mayor (deputy chief of government) in the government of Hamburg from 2001 to 2003.

He now lives in Brazil. Since 2014, Schill has appeared in inexpensively produced TV reality shows on German cable channels.

== Political career ==
Schill started his career as a judge at an Amtsgericht in Hamburg from 1993 to 2001. Due to his controversial rulings as a judge, which frequently involved the maximum penalty, he was given the nickname "Richter Gnadenlos" ("Judge Merciless"); most of these rulings were overruled by higher courts later on.

His new-found right-conservative party managed to gain 19.4% of all votes in the elections for Hamburg's parliament, the Bürgerschaft, on 23 September 2001. Following the elections, his party entered into a coalition government with the CDU led by Ole von Beust. Schill became second mayor of Hamburg and senator (equivalent of minister) of the interior; among other things, he announced that he would lower crime rates by 50% within 100 days, an undertaking which remained unsuccessful.

== Controversies ==
As a politician, Schill managed to get considerable media attention with his radical positions; among other things, he spoke out for the legalization of cannabis, demanded that sex offenders who did not respond to therapy be castrated, and stated that parents who failed to bring up their children "the right way" should be jailed. Furthermore, following the Moscow theater hostage crisis in October 2002, where 129 of 800 hostages were killed by an unknown chemical agent employed by the authorities to incapacitate the hostage-takers, he proposed that similar gas should also be used by German police to fight terrorism.

Shortly after assuming office, Schill was anonymously accused of cocaine abuse. He voluntarily underwent hair analysis which did not yield any evidence of cocaine consumption, and after the findings had been made public, the prosecution authorities stopped their proceedings against Schill.

=== 2002 Bundestag speech ===
Schill managed to cause a stir and a wave of indignation throughout the whole of Germany when he spoke in front of the Bundestag, Germany's federal parliament, in the final session of the 14th Bundestag on 29 August 2002. Though he was not a Member of the Bundestag, he was a Member of the Bundesrat as a Hamburg Senator. Members of the Bundesrat have the right to address the Bundestag at any time. In his speech, he said that the victims of the Elbe flood would not be able to be compensated due to too much money being given to foreign countries; he also berated politicians of all parties, his speech culminating in the words "We (in Germany) without doubt [...] have the most capable people, but the most incompetent politicians" ("Wir haben (in Deutschland) ohne Zweifel die tüchtigsten Menschen, aber [...] die unfähigsten Politiker").

He further reviled politicians by stating that they wasted money, went through the world with a "goblet of charity" to give away German tax money, brought refugees into the country and build "glamorous solitary cells" for prisoners; after accusing the parliament's vice president Anke Fuchs of violating the constitution, already over his time quota, he first was warned, then asked to finish his speech, and finally had the microphone turned off 15 minutes after the end of his timeshare.

== Removal as senator ==
In the summer of 2003 he made headlines again when another government official, Walter Wellinghausen, who held the office of a Staatsrat and was supported by Schill, was accused of illegally having a second employment; finally, Schill was removed from office by first mayor Ole von Beust (CDU) on 19 August 2003, due to "not being qualified (for the position) with regard to his character" ("charakterlich nicht geeignet").

This was preceded by a private discussion between von Beust and Schill, in which von Beust announced his intent to remove Wellinghausen from office. According to von Beust, Schill then threatened to make public an alleged love affair between von Beust and judiciary senator Roger Kusch (CDU), which would have resulted in a conflict of interests on von Beust's side.

Schill, on the other hand, told the press that he only had appealed to von Beust to not apply double standards, claiming that he mentioned the case of his fellow party member Mario Mettbach, who cancelled his decision to hire his significant other as an abstractor; he further stated that this collided with von Beust's making Kusch a senator and that the public had a right to be informed about these issues. Kusch publicly came out as gay soon afterwards; von Beust, however, did not comment further on his sexuality, pointing out that his sexual orientation was a private issue alone.

Schill's removal from office was appreciated by many organizations, including the churches and the police union, even though Schill continued to be a member of Hamburg's Bürgerschaft.

On 6 December 2003, the federal executive board of the Party for a Rule of Law Offensive, led by Mario Mettbach, removed Schill from his office as the party's chairman for Hamburg and denied him the right to assume further offices in the party. In response, Schill publicly ridiculed the party's executive board, stating that he could just as well have been removed from office by his haircutter.

Three days later, von Beust declared the coalition of CDU, FDP and Schill Party to be terminated and asked the parliament to order new elections. Another week later, on 16 December 2003, the Schill Party's federal executive board decided to expel Schill from the party.

On 18 December 2003, Schill, together with five former members of the Schill Party faction in the Hamburg state parliament, formed a new faction; his former partner, Katrin Freund, was elected chairwoman. He announced that if he did not manage to get 5% of all votes in the forthcoming parliamentary elections (and thus not be present in the new parliament), he would emigrate from Germany.

In the elections, on 29 February 2004, his group won only 3.1% of the votes. He confirmed that he would emigrate, "probably to South America."

== Since 2004 ==
In fall 2004, Schill emigrated to Cuba.

In late 2006, Hamburg Police issued a search warrant for him, as he is to testify as a witness in front of a Hamburg state parliament board of inquiry. As of December 2006, Schill was thought to be in the Rio de Janeiro area. In December 2007 he appeared in Itzehoe and was ordered to testify in front of the aforementioned board.

In March 2008, the German tabloid Bild reported that they were in possession of a video showing Schill consuming cocaine in Brazil. In the video he stated that as a judge he had regularly meted out harsher punishments to blacks, whom he disliked intensely. He also stated that his first cocaine test in 2001 yielded a positive result, but a retest with a less sensitive method then gave the desired negative result. Excerpts of this video were made available on YouTube.

Since 2014, Schill has appeared in inexpensively produced TV reality shows on German cable channels.
