= Dora Heyenn =

German politician (born 1949)

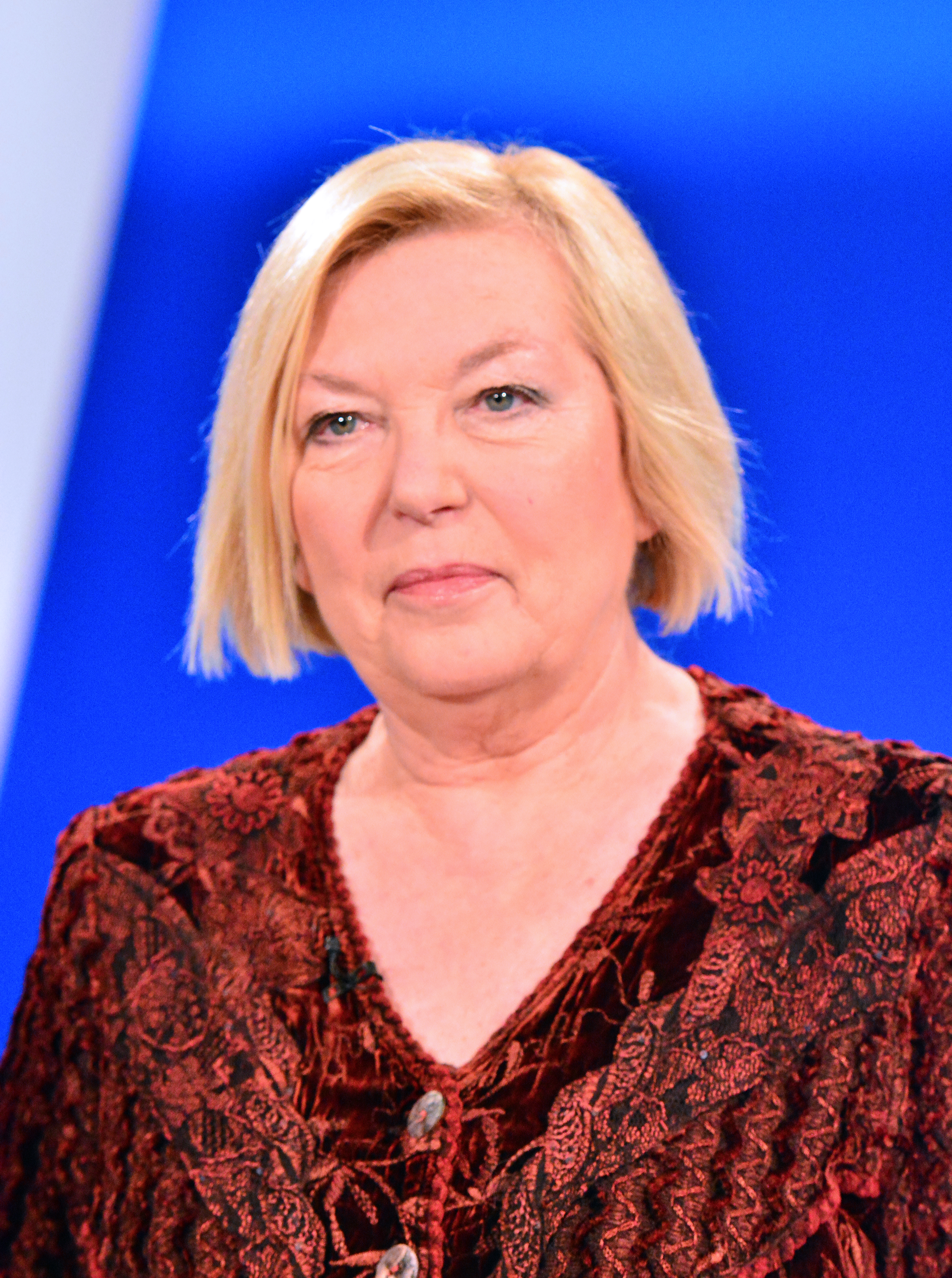
Dora Heyenn

Dora Heyenn (born 16 May 1949 in Kopendorf on Fehmarn) is a German biology and chemistry teacher and politician. She was a member of the Left Party until 2015, after which she joined the Social Democratic Party. Until 2020, she was a member of the state parliament of Hamburg.

== Political career ==
From 1971 on a member of the SPD, she was a member of the SPD's executive board in Germany's federal state of Schleswig-Holstein from 1979 until 1983. In 1990 she moved up to become a member of the Landtag of Schleswig-Holstein.

In 1999, she left the social democrats over her rejection of Chancellor Schröder's Hartz reforms. In 2005, she became a founding member of the WASG which eventually merged to become Die Linke in Germany.

In the 2008 state election, she led her party for the first time into representation in the German federal state of Hamburg and since then has been a member of the Hamburg Parliament. Following the 2011 state elections, she became parliamentary leader of her party. In 2012, Heyenn ran for co-leadership in the federal party, but with just above 29 percent lost to fellow candidate Katja Kipping who received 67 percent. In the 2015 Hamburg state elections she was again list leader of her party.
