= 2011 Hamburg state election =

State election in Hamburg, Germany

- 20 February 2011

All 121 seats in the Hamburg Parliament 61 seats needed for a majority
- Turnout: 3,444,602 (57.3%) ▼6.2%
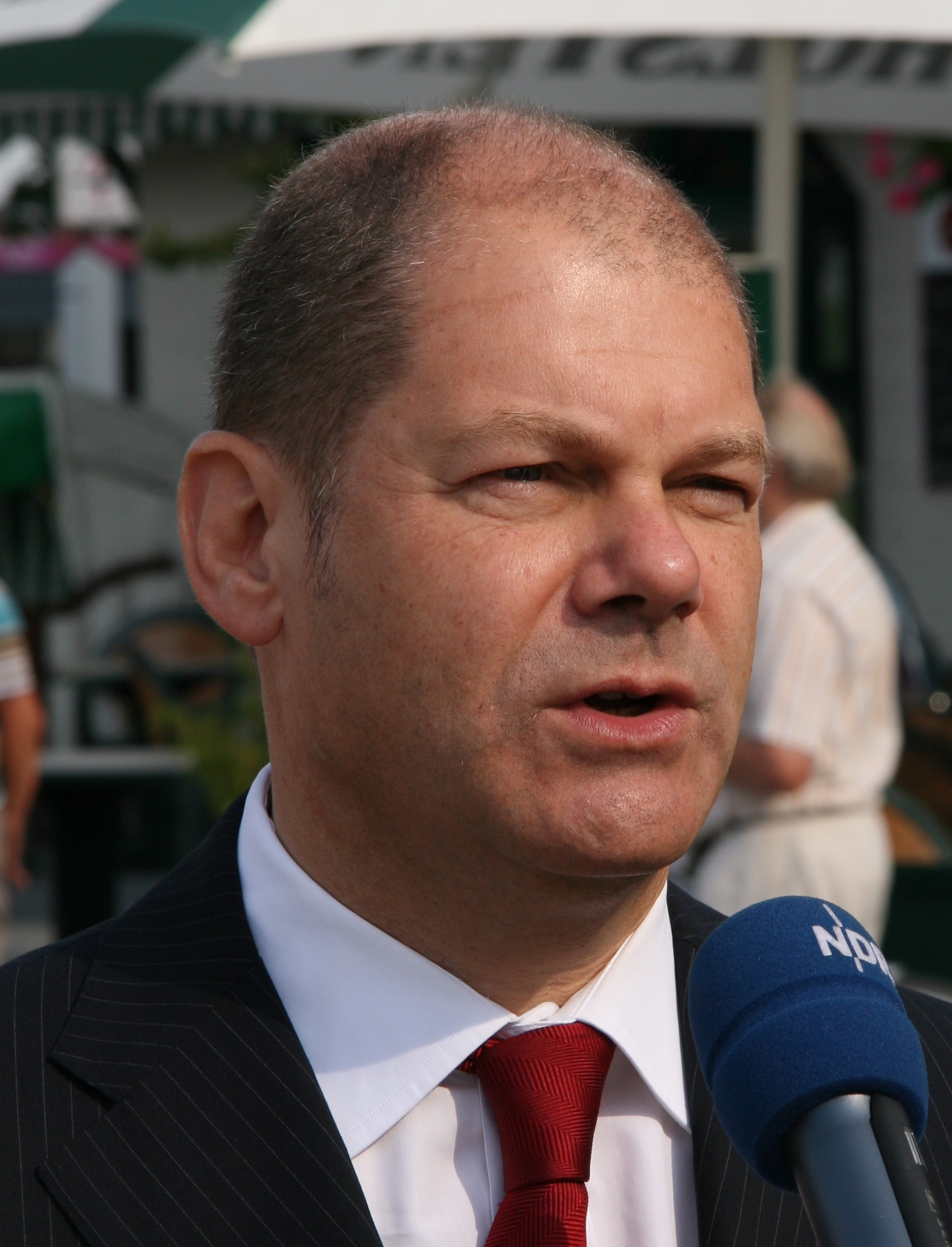

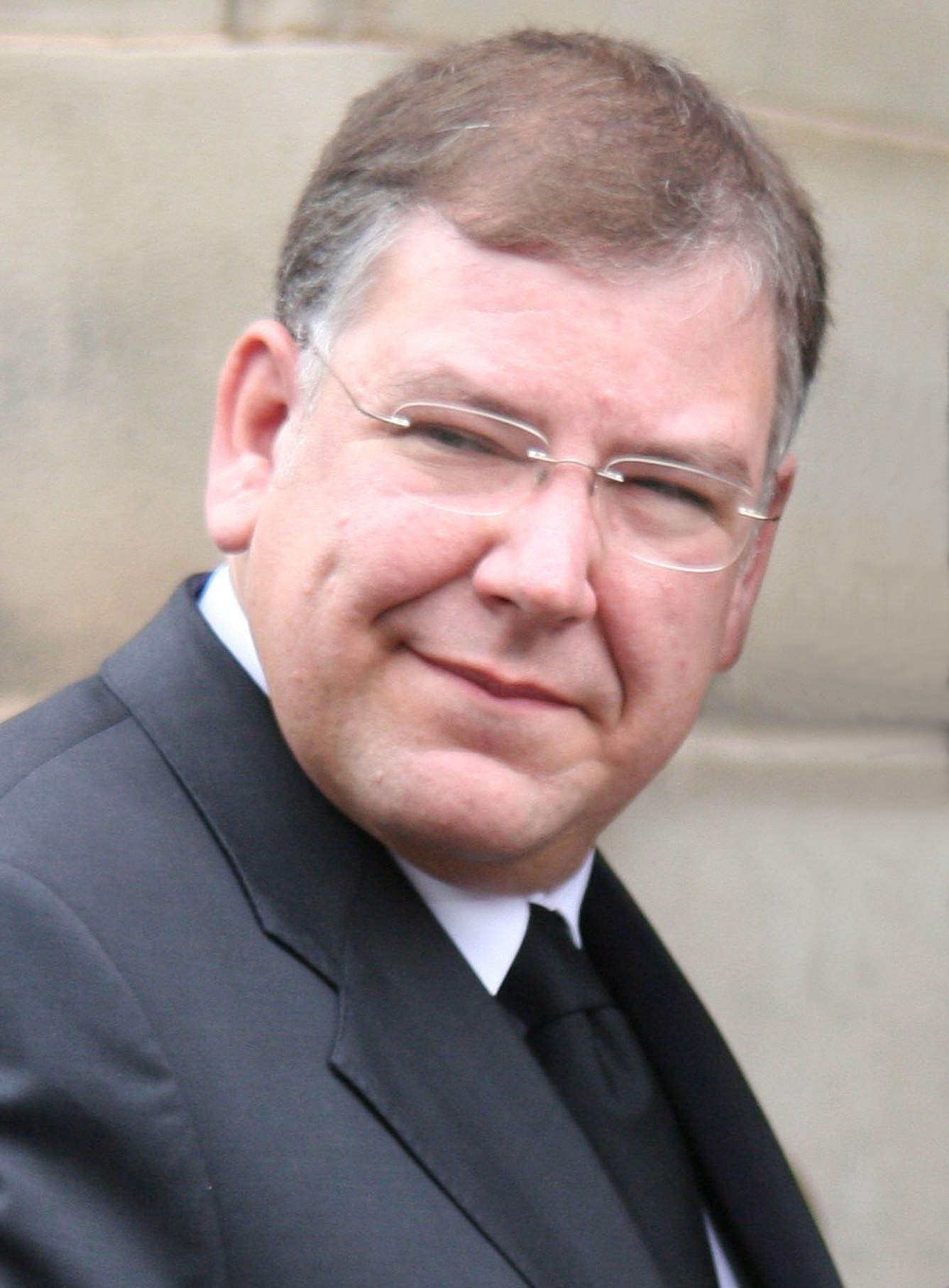

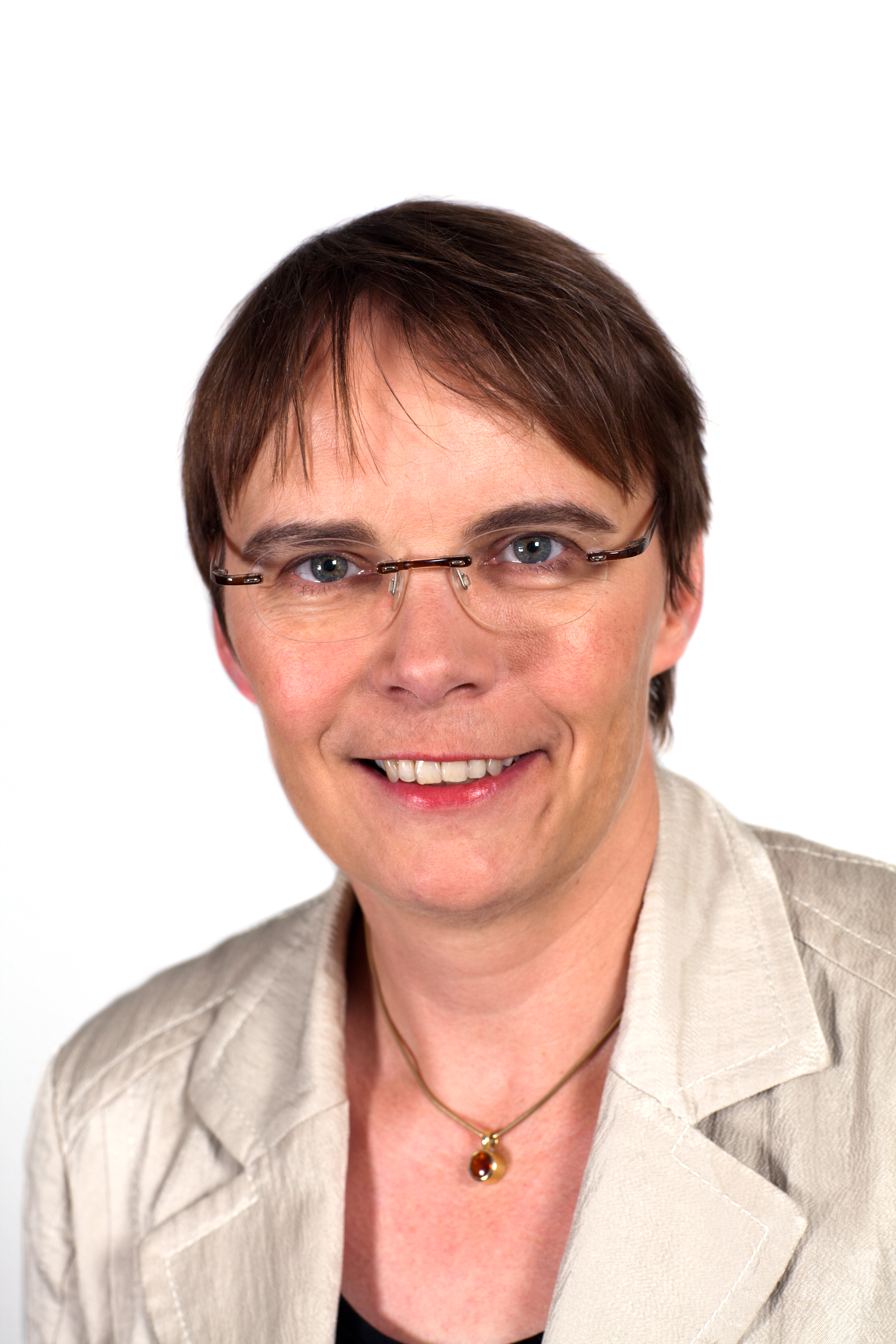

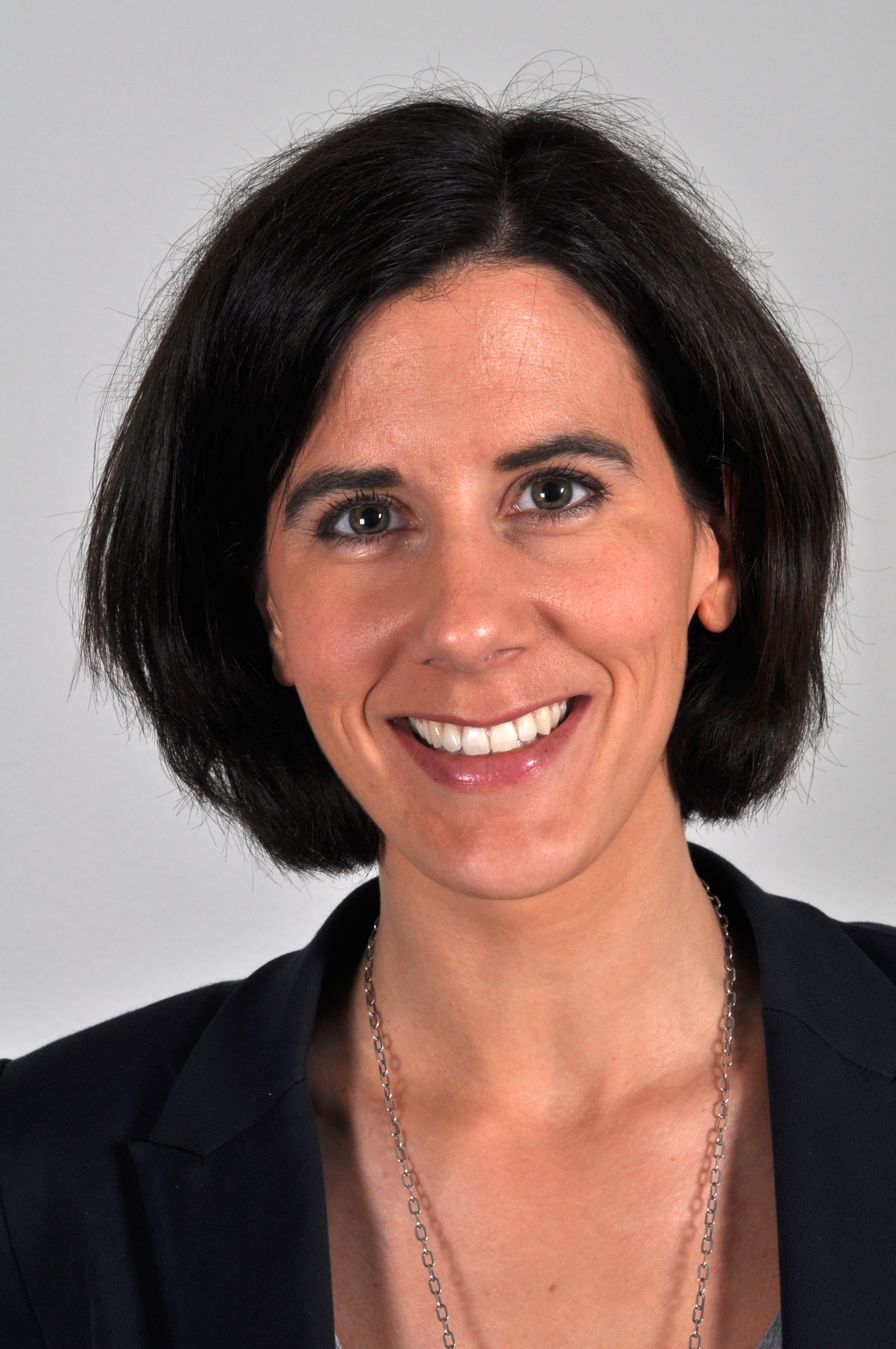

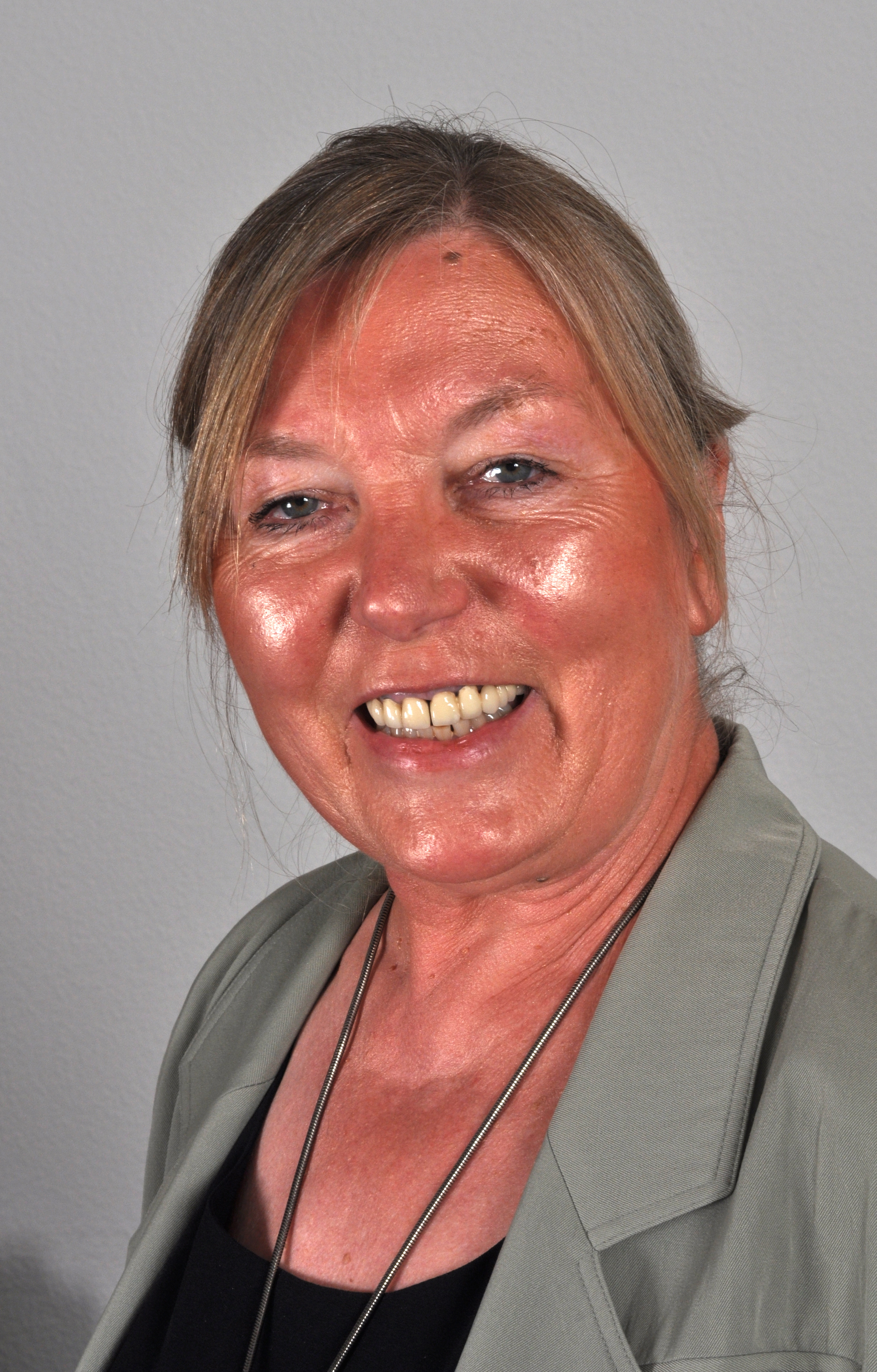
	First party	Second party	Third party
Leader	Olaf Scholz	Christoph Ahlhaus	Anja Hajduk
Party	SPD	CDU	Greens
Last election	45 seats, 34.1%	56 seats, 42.6%	12 seats, 9.6%
Seats won	62	28	14
Seat change	▲17	▼28	▲2
Popular vote	1,667,804	753,805	384,502
Percentage	48.4%	21.9%	11.2%
Swing	▲14.3%	▼20.7%	▲1.6%
	Fourth party	Fifth party
Leader	Katja Suding	Dora Heyenn
Party	FDP	Left
Last election	0 seats, 4.8%	8 seats, 6.4%
Seats won	9	8
Seat change	▲9	0
Popular vote	229,125	220,428
Percentage	6.7%	6.4%
Swing	▲1.9%	0.0%
Mayor before election
Christoph Ahlhaus
CDU
Elected Mayor
Olaf Scholz
SPD

The 2011 Hamburg state election was held on 20 February 2011 to elect the members of the 20th Hamburg Parliament. The election was triggered by the collapse of the coalition government between the Christian Democratic Union (CDU) and the Green Alternative List (GAL), which had governed the state since 2008. The election was a landslide defeat for the CDU, which lost half its voteshare and seats. The margin of defeat for the incumbent Ahlhaus Senate is the largest in post-war German history and has not been met since. Much of this lost support flowed to the Social Democratic Party (SPD), which won 62 of the 121 seats in Parliament, forming a majority government led by Olaf Scholz.

== Background ==
After the 2008 state election, the CDU formed a coalition government with the GAL. This was the first time such a government had been formed in Germany, as the Greens were seen as aligned with the SPD, typically in opposition to the CDU. Popular CDU mayor Ole von Beust was seen as a stabilising force for the government. After his retirement in August 2010 and the election of Christoph Ahlhaus as his successor, relations between the two parties became increasingly strained. In November 2010, GAL left the government. Ahlhaus formed a minority CDU Senate and the Parliament subsequently voted to dissolve itself and hold early elections.

== Parties ==
The table below lists parties represented in the 19th Hamburg Parliament.

Name		Ideology	Leader(s)	2008 result	
Name		Ideology	Leader(s)	Votes (%)	Seats
CDU	Christian Democratic Union of Germany; Christlich Demokratische Union Deutschlands	Christian democracy	Christoph Ahlhaus	42.58%	56 / 121
SPD	Social Democratic Party of Germany; Sozialdemokratische Partei Deutschlands	Social democracy	Olaf Scholz	34.15%	45 / 121
GAL	Green Alternative List; Grün-Alternative-Liste Hamburg	Green politics	Anja Hajduk	9.58%	12 / 121
Linke	The Left; Die Linke	Democratic socialism	Dora Heyenn	6.45%	8 / 121

== Opinion polling ==
Polling firm	Fieldwork date	Sample size	CDU	SPD	GAL	Linke	FDP	Others	Lead
2011 state election	20 Feb 2011	–	21.9	48.4	11.2	6.4	6.7	5.5	26.5
GMS	15–17 Feb 2011	1,002	25	43	15	6	5	6	18
Infratest dimap	8–10 Feb 2011	1,004	23.5	45	14	5.5	5	7	21.5
Forschungsgruppe Wahlen	7–10 Feb 2011	1,686	23	46	14.5	6	5	5.5	23
Emnid	4–10 Feb 2011	1,002	24	45	15	6	5	5	21
Infratest dimap	28 Jan–2 Feb 2011	1,000	25	46	14	6	5	4	21
Trend Research Hamburg	26–31 Jan 2011	627	25	45	16	6	4	4	20
Infratest dimap	7–11 Jan 2011	1,000	26	43	17	5	4	5	17
Trend Research Hamburg	10–14 Dec 2010	648	24	45	16	8	3	4	21
Infratest dimap	10–12 Dec 2010	1,000	22	43	19	7	4	5	21
Trend Research Hamburg	2–7 Dec 2010	678	22	45	17	7	3	6	23
Trend Research Hamburg	29 Nov–2 Dec 2010	653	24	44	17	7	4	5	20
Psephos	29 Nov–1 Dec 2010	1,002	28	45	14	6	3	4	17
Forschungsgruppe Wahlen	29–30 Nov 2010	1,006	22	41	21	7	4	5	19
Psephos	6–10 Nov 2010	1,004	35	40	12	6	4	3	5
Trend Research Hamburg	15–19 Oct 2010	612	25	35	17	11	4	8	10
Psephos	19–20 Jul 2010	1,005	35	41	10	6	4	4	6
Psephos	29 Jun–2 Jul 2010	1,007	36	39	11	6	5	3	3
Psephos	19–23 Apr 2010	1,004	34	37	10	8	8	?	3
Infratest dimap	17–21 Feb 2009	1,000	31	31	16	10	7	5	Tie
Psephos	December 2009	1,001	38	34	11	8	6	3	4
Psephos	26–30 Nov 2009	1,004	36	33	13	8	8	2	3
Infratest dimap	19–22 Feb 2009	1,000	36	33	12	8	9	2	3
Psephos	22–27 Nov 2008	1,003	44	31	11	6	5	3	13
Psephos	29 April–5 May 2008	1,004	43	34	10	7	4.5	1.5	9
2008 state election	24 Feb 2008	–	42.6	34.1	9.6	6.4	4.8	2.5	8.5

== Election result ==
Summary of the 20 February 2011 election results for the Hamburg Parliament
Party	Votes	%	+/–	Seats	+/–
Social Democratic Party (SPD)	1,667,804	48.42	▲14.27	62	▲17
Christian Democratic Union (CDU)	753,805	21.88	▼20.70	28	▼28
Green Alternative List (GAL)	384,502	11.16	▲1.58	14	▲2
Free Democratic Party (FDP)	229,125	6.65	▲1.90	9	▲9
The Left (Linke)	220,428	6.40	▼0.05	8	Steady
Pirate Party Germany (Piraten)	73,126	2.12	▲2.12	0	Steady
Others	115,812	3.36	▲1.68	0	Steady
Total	3,444,602	100.00	–	121	–
Registered voters/turnout		57.3	▼6.2		

Popular Vote
SPD	48.42%
CDU	21.88%
GAL	11.16%
FDP	6.65%
DIE LINKE	6.40%
PIRATEN	2.12%
Other	3.36%

Bürgerschaft seats
SPD	51.24%
CDU	23.14%
GAL	11.57%
FDP	7.44%
DIE LINKE	6.61%

== See also ==
- Elections in Hamburg
- Hamburg state elections in the Weimar Republic
