= Hamburg Finkenwerder Airport =

Aircraft manufacturing plant and private airport in Germany

Airbus Hamburg-Finkenwerder Airbus-Werk Hamburg-Finkenwerder

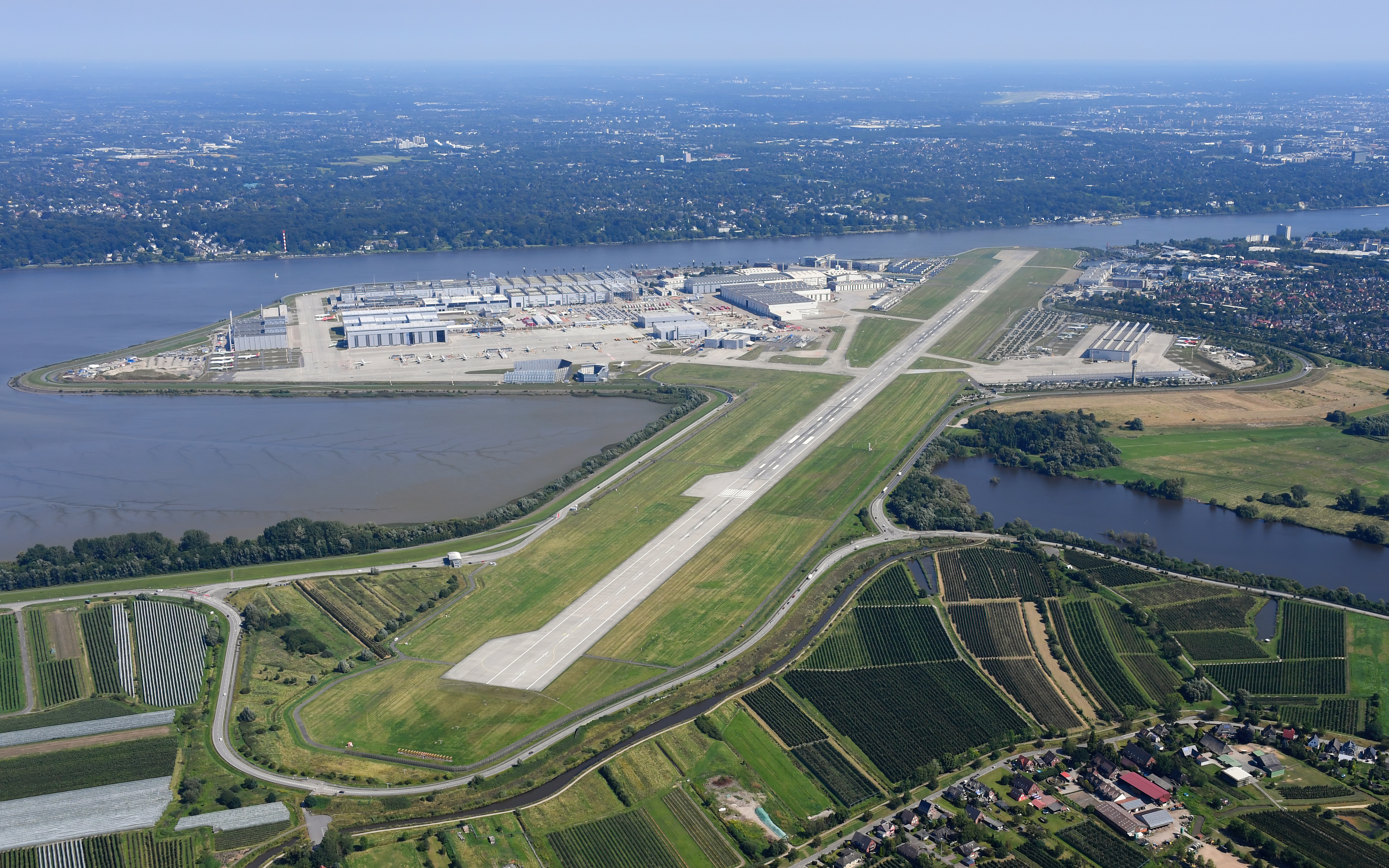
- IATA: XFW; ICAO: EDHI

Summary
- Airport type: Private
- Owner: Airbus
- Serves: Hamburg Metropolitan Region
- Location: Finkenwerder, Hamburg, Germany
- Elevation AMSL: 6 m / 21 ft
- Coordinates: 53°32′09″N 09°50′13″E

Map
- Location of airport in Hamburg XFW (Germany)

Runways
Direction	Length		Surface
Direction	m	ft	Surface
05/23	3,183	10,443	Concrete/Asphalt
- AIP at German air traffic control.

Airbus Hamburg-Finkenwerder (IATA: XFW, ICAO: EDHI) — also known as Hamburg Finkenwerder Airport — is an aircraft manufacturing plant and associated private airport in the Finkenwerder quarter of southwest Hamburg, Germany. The airport is an integral part of the Airbus-owned plant, and is exclusively used by that company for corporate, freight, test, and delivery flights with the final assembly of the A320neo family of aircraft being conducted here.

== History ==
In 1933, the Blohm & Voss shipbuilding company in Hamburg expanded into aircraft manufacturing, anticipating demand for all-metal, long-range flying boats, particularly from the German state airline Deutsche Luft Hansa. The company also considered its experience in all-metal marine construction applicable to aircraft production. To support the venture, Blohm & Voss established Hamburger Flugzeugbau (HFB) as a subsidiary company. Initial manufacturing took place at the Blohm & Voss shipyard, while an inland airfield and final assembly facility for landplanes were established at Wenzendorf Aircraft Factory.

In 1937, HFB was reorganized as an operating division of Blohm & Voss rather than a separate company. The Finkenwerder aircraft works and associated airfield were established by the division in 1939. The facilities were heavily damaged during World War II. After aircraft manufacturing resumed under the HFB name, the site underwent a series of expansions and modernization projects. The foundations of the Fink II submarine pen remain east of the northern end of the runway.

During the Berlin Airlift, detachments from both No. 201 Squadron RAF and No. 230 Squadron RAF flew Short Sunderland V's.

In 1964, both the HFB 320 Hansa Jet and the third prototype Transall C-160 made their first flights from the airport. Through a series of mergers and acquisitions, HFB and its Finkenwerder facility eventually became part of Airbus.

Between April 2006 and July 2007, the runway was extended at the southern end, increasing its length from 2,684 to 3,183 metres (8,806 to 10,443 ft), in order to accommodate the then planned freight version of the Airbus A380.

Airbus offers factory tours and a visitor terrace, overlooking the runway.

== Manufacturing ==
The Airbus facilities at Finkenwerder employ approximately 15,000 people. The plant operates four final assembly lines for the A320neo family, the most recent of which opened in June 2018 along with a larger and modernised delivery centre. In October 2019, Airbus inaugurated a highly automated fuselage structure assembly line for A320-family aircraft. To support production of the A321XLR, Airbus established a dedicated aft-fuselage production line at the site in February 2021, using a former A380 facility to enable the ramp-up of XLR-specific structures without disrupting overall A320neo-family output.

The site also hosts a large global spares centre holding approximately 120,000 parts, along with maintenance and training facilities for the A320 family.

In addition to single-aisle production, the Hamburg factory manufactures and equips the forward and rear fuselage sections for the Airbus A330neo and Airbus A350, which receive final assembly in France.

== Airlines and destinations ==
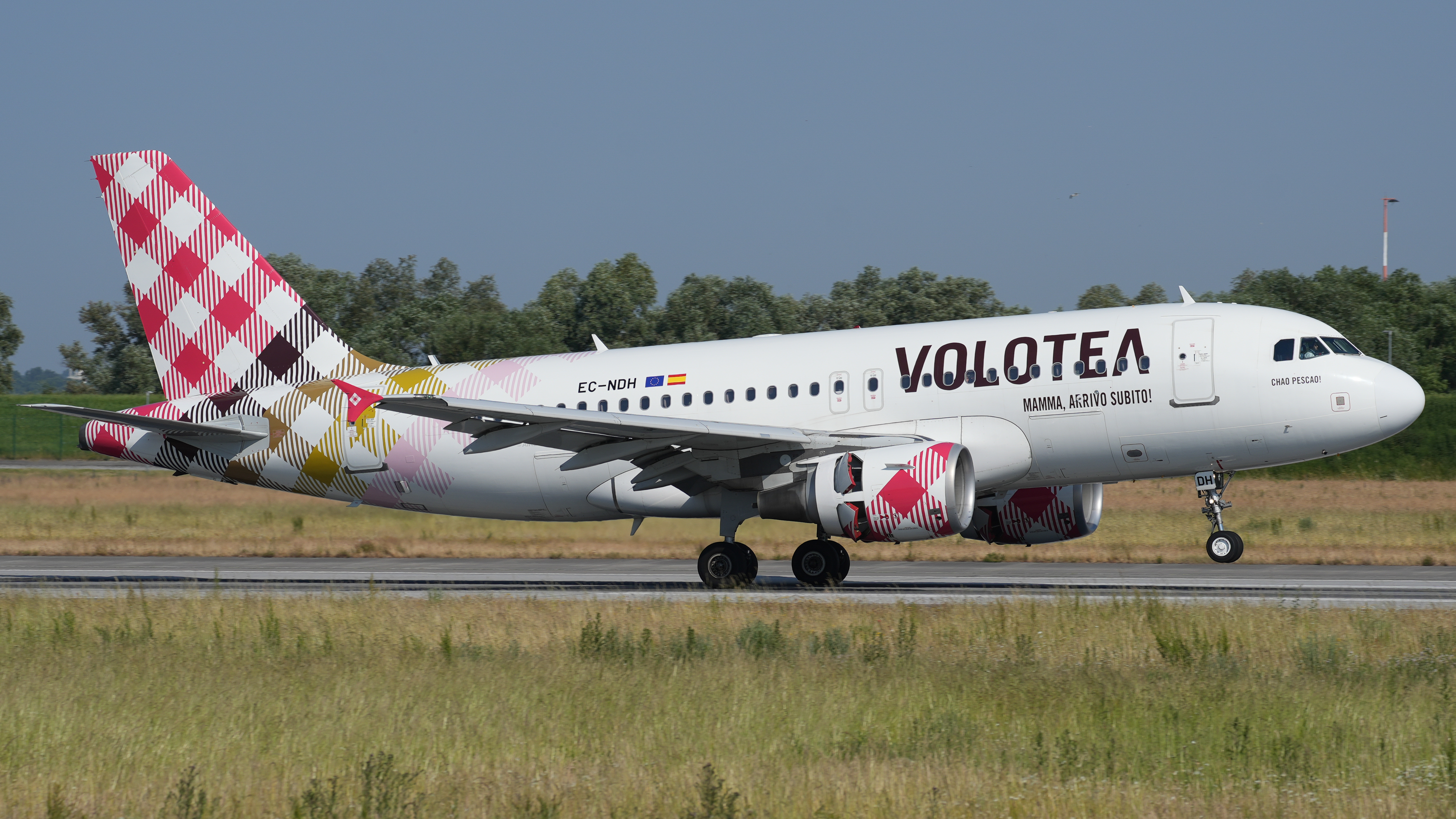
Volotea Airbus A319, operating the Airbus corporate shuttle, landing at Finkenwerder

There are no scheduled public services at Finkenwerder. The airport handles about 10 to 15 aircraft movements per day, most of which are transfer, freight, and test flights related to Airbus manufacturing operations. Since 4 November 2019, the twice-daily corporate shuttle service to the Airbus plant in Toulouse has been operated by the Spanish carrier Volotea. The service was previously operated by Germania and PrivatAir.

== Incidents and accidents ==
- In 1967 the pilot of a Spantax Convair 990 Coronado mistook the 1360 m long runway of Finkenwerder for the 3000 m long runway of Hamburg Airport in Fuhlsbüttel, and only just brought the aircraft to a stop before the end of the runway.

== See also ==
- Hamburg Airport
- Transport in Germany
- List of airports in Germany
