= Ole von Beust =

German politician (born 1955)

Ole von Beust MdHB a. D. Senator a. D. MdBR a. D.
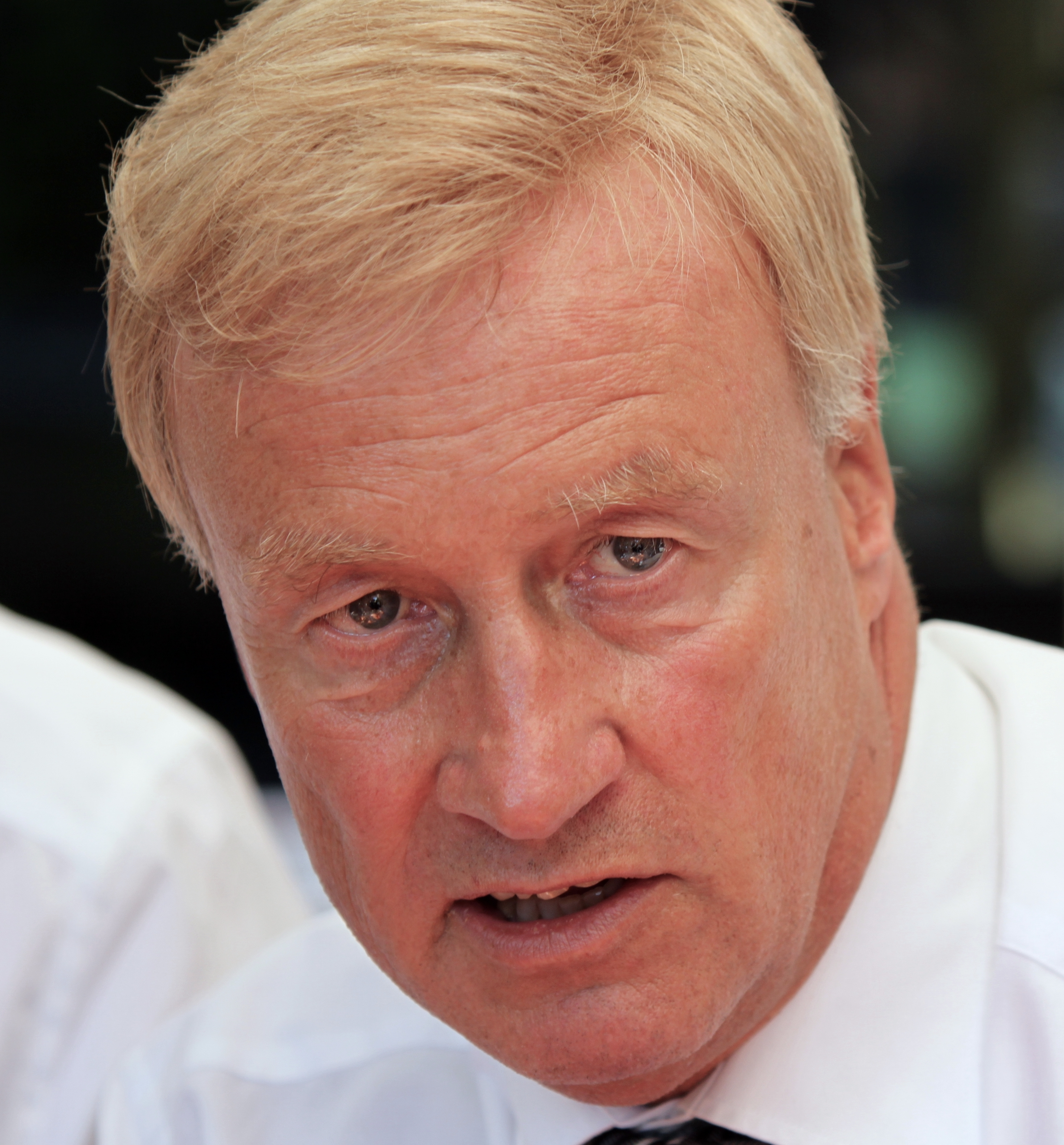
- Ole von Beust in 2009

First Mayor of Hamburg
- In office 31 October 2001 – 25 August 2010
- Second Mayor: Ronald Schill; Mario Mettbach; Birgit Schnieber-Jastram; Christa Goetsch
- Preceded by: Ortwin Runde
- Succeeded by: Christoph Ahlhaus

President of the Bundesrat
- In office 1 November 2007 – 31 October 2008
- First Vice President: Harald Ringstorff
- Preceded by: Harald Ringstorff
- Succeeded by: Peter Müller

Leader of the Christian Democratic Union in the Hamburg Parliament
- In office 15 December 1993 – 31 October 2001
- Preceded by: Rolf Kruse
- Succeeded by: Michael Freytag

Member of the Hamburg Parliament
- In office 28 June 1978 – 17 March 2004
- Preceded by: multi-member district
- Succeeded by: multi-member district
- Constituency: CDU list

Personal details
- Born: 13 April 1955 (age 71) Hamburg, West Germany
- Party: Christian Democratic Union
- Education: University of Hamburg
- Occupation: Politician; Lawyer; Lobbyist

Ole von Beust (born 13 April 1955) is a former German politician who was First Mayor of Hamburg from 31 October 2001 to 25 August 2010, serving as President of the Bundesrat from 1 November 2007 on for one year. He was succeeded as mayor by Christoph Ahlhaus.

== Life and work ==
Born in Hamburg as Carl-Friedrich Arp Freiherr von Beust, he is the son of Achim Helge Freiherr von Beust and Hanna, née Wolff, who was considered half Jewish in Nazi Germany. The von Beust family is an old noble family from the Altmark, which appears in 1228 for the first time. Through his father he is a descendant of Saxon and Austrian statesman Count Friedrich Ferdinand von Beust. He had his nickname Ole registered as his first name.

In 1971 von Beust became a member of the conservative Christian Democratic Union (CDU). In 1973, after finishing high school, he worked for CDU parliamentary group in the Hamburg Parliament ("Hamburgische Bürgerschaft"), a position he held until he started to study law in 1975 at the University of Hamburg. From 1977 until 1983 he was Hamburg president of the youth organisation of his party. Since 1978 von Beust has been a member of the Hamburg city-state's parliament. In 1983 he successfully completed his studies and became an independent lawyer.

He has been a member of the ruling council of the Hamburg Land CDU since 1992, and of the national ruling council of the CDU party since 1998.

=== First Mayor of Hamburg ===
==== First term ====
On 31 October 2001, Ole von Beust became First Mayor of Hamburg.

When Hamburg experienced an exodus of jobs after major corporations including cigarette-maker Reemtsma, travel and shipping company Hapag-Lloyd, haircare products-maker Hans Schwarzkopf and the Vereins and Westbank AG were acquired by companies outside of Hamburg, von Beust had the city's investment arm, the Hamburger Gesellschaft für Beteiligungsverwaltung, join forces with retailer Tchibo for the acquisition of cosmetics maker Beiersdorf in 2003. This put American multinational Procter & Gamble out of the bidding and preserved Beiersdorf as a publicly traded, stand-alone company in Hamburg.

As host of Hamburg's annual St. Matthew's Day banquet for the city's civic and business leaders, von Beust invited several high-ranking guests of honour to the city, including Queen Silvia of Sweden (2003), King Abdullah II of Jordan (2005), Crown Prince Frederik of Denmark (2006), President Jakaya Kikwete of Tanzania (2008).

On 19 August 2003, von Beust dismissed his vice-mayor, Ronald Schill, causing a scandal. Von Beust had earlier dismissed Walter Wellinghausen, senator of the interior and Schill's most important official, without consulting Schill beforehand. This was due to public allegations of misconduct on Wellinghausen's part. In a private conversation, Schill then demanded that von Beust take back the dismissal, allegedly using personal threats. Von Beust then decided to dismiss Schill as well.

In the (preassigned) press conference Schill held minutes after he had heard of his own dismissal, he spoke vaguely of "homosexual relationships", a "flat in an infamous hustler district" and "certain things happened that let one infer the occurrence of love acts" between von Beust and Roger Kusch, who von Beust had appointed minister (in German city-states "senator") of justice. Von Beust in turn stated that Schill threatened to make his alleged liaison with Kusch public under the premise that von Beust intermingled public and private affairs. He said he had no sexual relationship with Kusch, that they merely knew each other for 25 years and were good friends, and that von Beust was Kusch's landlord. "This is all – absolutely all", according to von Beust.

His unprepared statement to the press quickly earned Schill a homophobic reputation. A popular radio-station broadcast a song calling him "Mega-Proll" (mega redneck) and gay and lesbian associations protested vocally. Schill however later affirmed von Beust's version of the story, except for the accusations of blackmail, saying that he warned von Beust to stay clear of nepotism, and that this had nothing to do with von Beust's sexual orientation. He stated "I have nothing against homosexuals".

In a later interview, von Beust's father confirmed that his son is indeed homosexual. Von Beust himself considers his sexual orientation a private matter; when asked directly he usually ironically refers the interviewer to his father. He has been in a relationship with his partner Lukas Förster since 2009 when the high school student completed an internship at the town hall. In 2013, the 56-year-old ex-mayor married his 22-year-old partner.

==== Second term ====
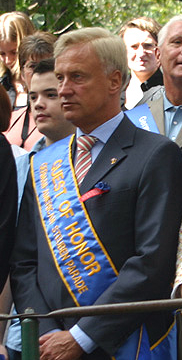
Ole von Beust 2006 as guest of honor at the Von Steuben Day in New York

The Hamburg elections of 29 February 2004, ended with an unprecedented landslide victory for Ole von Beust and the CDU, with the party achieving an overall majority in the city-state's parliament. The CDU gained 47.2 percent of the vote, a full 21-point increase from the previous election in September 2001. This was the first time since 1993 the city-state has had only a single ruling party.

Under von Beust's leadership, the Hamburg state government made the decision to commence construction of the Elbphilharmonie, a concert hall in the HafenCity quarter.

Between 2007 and 2009, von Beust was one of 32 members of the Second Commission on the modernization of the federal state, which had been established to reform the division of powers between federal and state authorities in Germany.

==== Third term ====
In the Hamburg elections of 24 February 2008, the CDU gained 42.6 percent of the vote. Thus, the CDU continued to be the strongest party in Hamburg. However, since the CDU lost its absolute majority, it formed a coalition government with the Greens. At the time, the two party's cooperation was widely seen as a test for a possible coalition at the national level.

In February 2009, von Beust and Minister President Peter Harry Carstensen of Schleswig-Holstein agreed on a €13 billion bailout of state-owned shipping financier HSH Nordbank. The two states were forced to intervene after the SoFFin fund, which had been set up by the federal government in 2008 to stabilize the financial markets, said it could not help out HSH Nordbank until it got rid of all its bad debts.

Ahead of the 2009 national elections, von Beust was tipped as potential Federal Minister for Economic Cooperation and Development in the cabinet of Chancellor Angela Merkel; in the negotiations on a coalition agreement with the FDP, however, the position went to Dirk Niebel.

In 2010, von Beust became the first German state leader to indicate that his state was in principle willing to provide humanitarian solutions for former Guantanamo inmates approved for release; Hamburg later accepted one released detainee.

On 18 July 2010, von Beust announced his resignation, to take effect on 25 August. Leaving office alongside von Beust were Karin von Welck, Hamburg's State Minister for Culture, and Volkmar Schoen of the senate chancellery.

Shortly after, voters in Hamburg toppled von Beust's proposed education reforms in the city-state's first binding referendum. The vote assured the preservation of Hamburg's four-year primary schools, rather than extending primary education to six years, which the ruling coalition of Christian Democrats and Greens had proposed.

== Life after politics ==
Upon leaving active politics, von Beust opened his own law firm and joined consultancy Roland Berger as advisor. In 2012, he succeeded Klaus von Dohnányi as Executive Director of the Hamburg Foundation for Politically Persecuted People.

During a strike of ground crew at Frankfurt Airport in February 2012, von Beust was appointed as arbitrator by airport operator Fraport for negotiations with trade union GdF. The union accepted his proposed settlement plan; Fraport, however, rejected the deal.

In addition, von Beust has been holding various paid and unpaid positions, including the following:

- Friends of the Fraekelufer Synagogue, Member of the Board of Trustees
- Alliander AG, Member of the Advisory Board (since 2016)
- BoxDirect AG, Member of the Supervisory Board
- CH2 Contorhaus Hansestadt Hamburg AG, Chairman of the Supervisory Board
- Donner & Reuschel, Advisor (since 2014)
- ECE Projektmanagement, Member of the Sustainability Board
- Germela, Member of the Advisory Board
- Varengold Bank, Member of the Advisory Board (since 2013)
- Wirtschaftsrat der CDU, Member of the Board
- Rotary International, Member
- HafenCity Hamburg GmbH, Ex-Officio Chairman of the Supervisory Board (2010)

In late 2015, von Beust was named co-chairman (alongside Jürgen Trittin and Matthias Platzeck) of a government-appointed commission tasked with recommending by early 2016 how to safeguard the funding of fulfilling Germany's exit from nuclear energy. By April 2016, the commission agreed to ask the power firms to pay €23.3 billion ($26.4 billion) into a state fund to cover the costs of nuclear waste storage.

== Political positions ==
For the 2021 national elections, von Beust endorsed Markus Söder as the Christian Democrats' joint candidate to succeed Chancellor Angela Merkel.

== Recognition ==
Von Beust was a finalist for the World Mayor prize of 2010.

== See also ==
- List of LGBT heads of government
