= Michael Freytag =

German politician

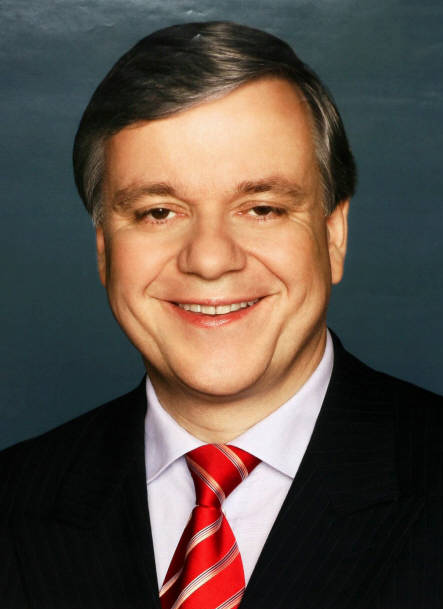
- Michael Freytag in 2008

Minister of Finance
- In office 2008–2010
- Preceded by: Wolfgang Peiner
- Succeeded by: Carsten Frigge

Personal details
- Born: 4 May 1958 (age 67) Hamburg
- Party: CDU

Michael Freytag (born 4 May 1958 in Hamburg) is a German politician, jurist, former minister of finance of Hamburg and former chairman of the CDU Hamburg.

== Life and work ==
After finishing school in 1977 at Wandsbeker Matthias-Claudius-Gymnasium, Freytag first completed an apprenticeship as a bank clerk and then studied law at the University of Hamburg. For some time he worked in overseas offices of the Federal Republic of Germany in Chicago and at the German Business Association of Hong Kong. In 1990 he graduated with a PhD thesis on the possibilities and limits of parliamentary reform of the German Bundestag. From 1991 to 2001, Michael Freytag worked in corporate banking at Deutsche Bank. Following this, Freytag moved full-time into politics. Michael Freytag, is married and has three children.

== Party ==
In 1982, Freytag became a member of the district assembly in Hamburg-Nord for the CDU. There, he was Chairman of the CDU parliamentary group from 1986 to 2000 and from 2000 to 2007 the District Chairman of Hamburg-Nord. From 2002 to 2007 he also served as Deputy Chairman of the CDU in Hamburg. On 15 September 2007 he was elected as the successor of Dirk Fischer to become chairman of the CDU in Hamburg with 93.62% of the votes. He was re-elected in June 2008 with 72.95% of the votes.

== Public offices ==
On 17 March 2004 he was appointed as the Senator for Urban Development and Environment of Hamburg in the state government led by Ole von Beust and on January 1, 2007, he succeeded Wolfgang Peiner as Finance Senator of Hamburg following Peiner's resignation from political office.

In March 2010, Freytag resigned from his position as chairman and as Senator of Finance to instead become CEO of the Schufa Holding AG. He has been leading the company since November 2010.

== See also ==
- Government of Hamburg
