= 2004 Hamburg state election =

State election in Hamburg, Germany

- 29 February 2004

All 121 seats in the Hamburg Parliament 61 seats needed for a majority
- Turnout: 824,317 (68.7%) ▼2.4%
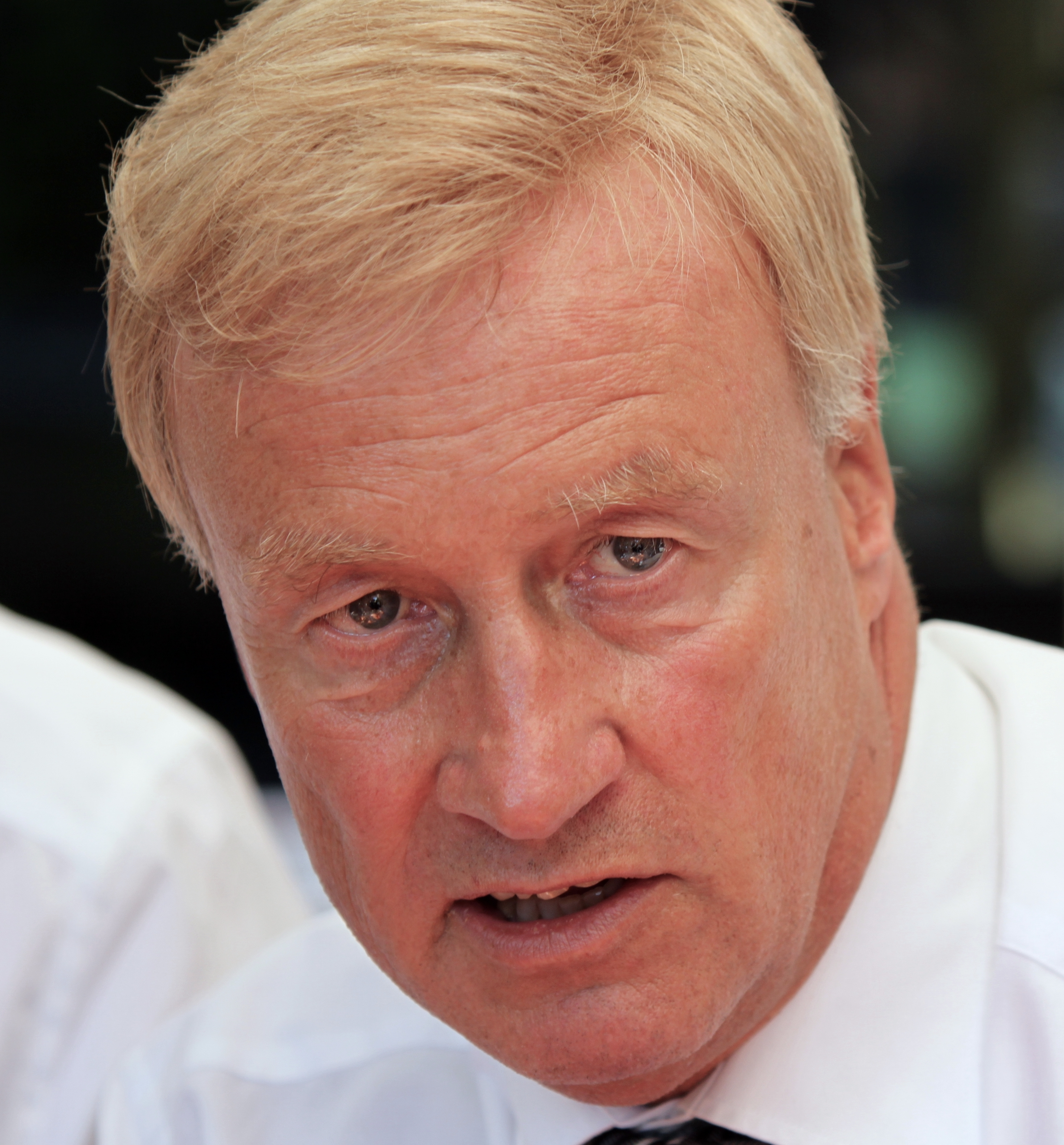

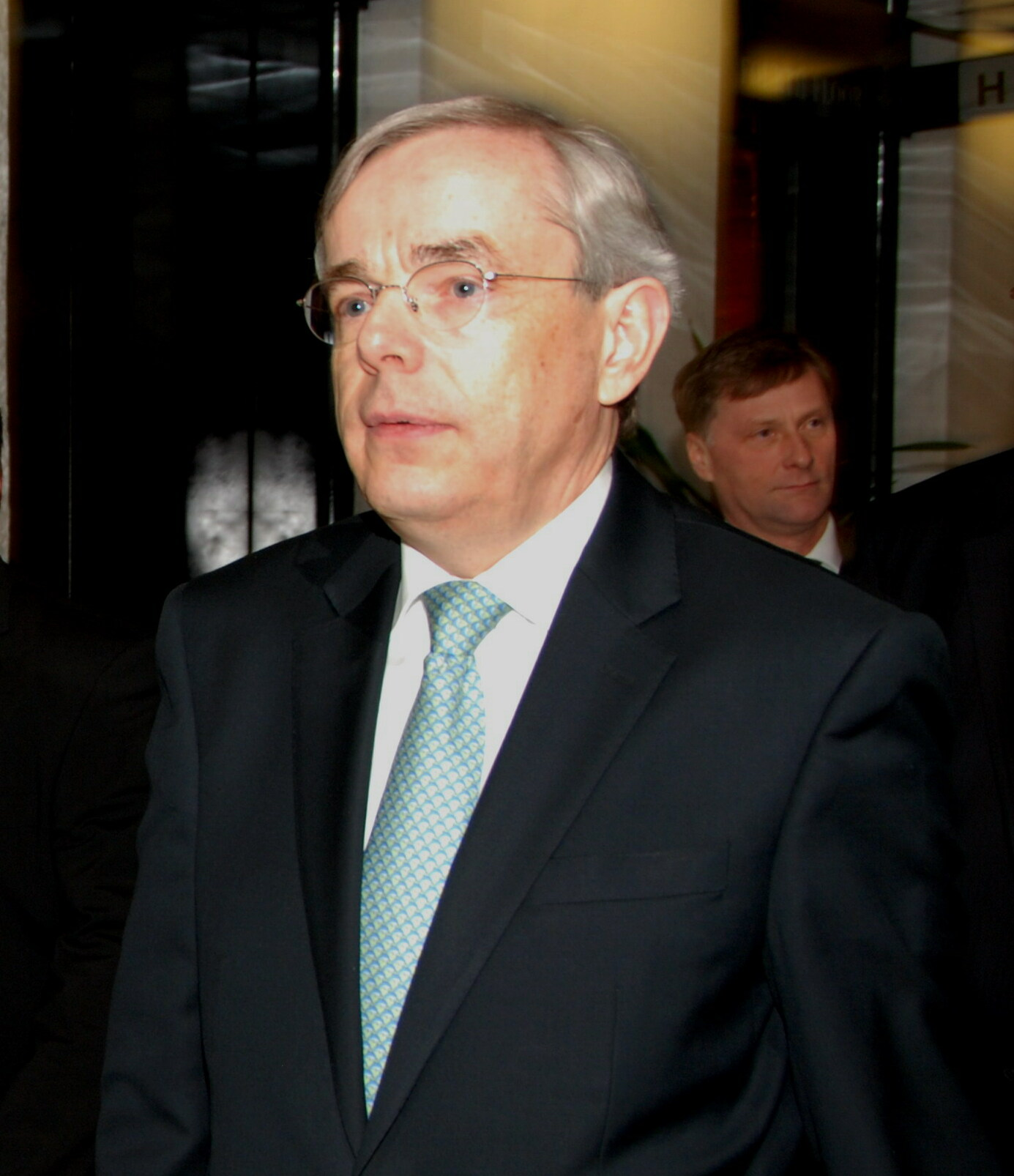
| | First party | Second party | Third party |
|---|---|---|---|
| Leader | Ole von Beust | Thomas Mirow |
| Party | CDU | SPD | Greens |
| Last election | 33 seats, 26.2% | 46 seats, 36.5% | 11 seats, 8.6% |
| Seats won | 63 | 41 | 17 |
| Seat change | ▲30 | ▼5 | ▲6 |
| Popular vote | 389,170 | 251,441 | 101,227 |
| Percentage | 47.2% | 30.5% | 12.3% |
| Swing | ▲21.0% | ▼6.0% | ▲3.7% |
| | Fourth party | Fifth party |
| Leader | | Mario Mettbach |
| Party | FDP | PRO |
| Last election | 6 seats, 5.1% | 25 seats, 19.4% |
| Seats won | 0 | 0 |
| Seat change | ▼6 | ▼25 |
| Popular vote | 23,373 | 3,046 |
| Percentage | 2.8% | 0.4% |
| Swing | ▼2.3% | ▼19.0% |
Mayor before election
Ole von Beust
CDU
Elected Mayor
Ole von Beust
CDU

The 2004 Hamburg state election was held on 29 February 2004 to elect the members of the 18th Hamburg Parliament. The election was triggered by the collapse of the coalition government between the Christian Democratic Union (CDU), Party for a Rule of Law Offensive (PRO), and Free Democratic Party (FDP). The election saw a collapse in support for PRO which had split after its leader Ronald Schill left in 2003. The original party and Schill's new party captured 3.5% of the vote between them, down from 19.4% in 2001. A huge amount of support flowed to the CDU, which won 63 of the 121 seats in Parliament, forming a majority government. First Mayor Ole von Beust continued in office.

== Parties ==
The table below lists parties represented in the 17th Hamburg Parliament.

| Name | | Ideology | Leader(s) | 2001 result | |
| Name | | Ideology | Leader(s) | Votes (%) | Seats |
|---|---|---|---|---|---|
| SPD | Social Democratic Party of Germany; Sozialdemokratische Partei Deutschlands | Social democracy | Thomas Mirow | 36.5% | 46 / 121 |
| CDU | Christian Democratic Union of Germany; Christlich Demokratische Union Deutschlands | Christian democracy | Ole von Beust | 26.2% | 33 / 121 |
| PRO | Party for a Rule of Law Offensive; Partei Rechtsstaatlicher Offensive | Right-wing populism | Mario Mettbach | 19.4% | 25 / 121 |
| GAL | Green Alternative List; Grün-Alternative-Liste Hamburg | Green politics | | 8.6% | 11 / 121 |
| FDP | Free Democratic Party; Freie Demokratische Partei | Classical liberalism | | 5.1% | 6 / 121 |

== Background ==
In August 2003, Mayor von Beust made moves to dismiss an Interior official suspected of corruption. In response, Senator of the Interior Ronald Schill threatened to spread rumours of an affair between von Beust and the Senator of Justice. Schill was subsequently dismissed from the government. In December of the same year, Schill left his own party along with five of its members of Parliament, depriving the government of its majority. He subsequently joined Pro DM.

== Opinion polling ==
| Polling firm | Fieldwork date | Sample size | SPD | CDU | PRO | GAL | FDP | ProDM | Others | Lead |
|---|---|---|---|---|---|---|---|---|---|---|
| 2004 state election | 29 Feb 2004 | – | 30.5 | 47.2 | 0.4 | 12.3 | 2.8 | 3.1 | 3.7 | 16.7 |
| Emnid | 20–26 Feb 2004 | 1,009 | 30 | 44 | 1 | 14 | 4 | 4 | 3 | 14 |
| Emnid | 24 Feb 2004 | 1,000 | 30 | 46 | 1 | 13 | 3 | 3 | 4 | 16 |
| Forsa | 18–23 Feb 2004 | 1,005 | 29 | 45 | 1 | 14 | 4 | 3 | 4 | 16 |
| Psephos | 19–22 Feb 2004 | 1,003 | 30 | 46 | 1 | 12 | 3.5 | 3.5 | 4 | 16 |
| Forschungsgruppe Wahlen | 16–19 Feb 2004 | 1,008 | 29 | 47 | – | 13 | 4 | 3 | 4 | 18 |
| Infratest dimap | 12–16 Feb 2004 | 1,000 | 29 | 45 | 1 | 14 | 4 | 4 | 3 | 16 |
| Forsa | 10–14 Feb 2004 | 1,002 | 30 | 45 | 1 | 14 | 4 | 3 | 3 | 15 |
| Forsa | 6–9 Feb 2004 | 804 | 29 | 46 | 1 | 14 | 4 | 3 | 3 | 17 |
| Infratest dimap | 28 Jan–1 Feb 2004 | 1,000 | 30 | 45 | 1 | 15 | 3 | 3 | 3 | 15 |
| Forsa | 20–24 Jan 2004 | 1,001 | 28 | 48 | 1 | 13 | 4 | 3 | 3 | 20 |
| Emnid | 19 Jan 2004 | 1,000 | 31 | 46 | 2 | 12 | 4 | 2 | 3 | 15 |
| Infratest dimap | 8–12 Jan 2004 | 1,000 | 30 | 45 | 1 | 13 | 4 | 4 | 3 | 15 |
| Psephos | 9 Jan 2004 | 1,002 | 30 | 47 | 2 | 11 | 2 | 4 | 4 | 17 |
| Forsa | 17 Dec 2003 | ? | 31 | 46 | 3 | 13 | 4 | – | 3 | 15 |
| Infratest | 10–11 Dec 2003 | 1,000 | 33 | 43 | 4 | 12 | 4 | – | 4 | 10 |
| Emnid | 10 Dec 2003 | 1,000 | 37 | 43 | 2 | 12 | 4 | – | 2 | 6 |
| Psephos | 9–10 Dec 2003 | 808 | 36 | 41 | 5 | 11 | 3 | – | 4 | 5 |
| Infratest dimap | 8–9 Dec 2003 | 1,000 | 35 | 40 | 5 | 13 | 4 | – | 3 | 5 |
| Emnid | 2–3 Dec 2003 | 1,000 | 35 | 41 | 5 | 13 | 3 | – | 3 | 6 |
| Psephos | 10 Oct 2003 | ? | 37 | 39 | 6 | 10 | 4 | – | 4 | 2 |
| Infratest dimap | 5–9 Sep 2003 | 1,000 | 36 | 39 | 5 | 13 | 4 | – | 3 | 3 |
| Psephos | 23 Aug 2003 | 731 | 36 | 40 | 6 | 10 | 5 | – | 3 | 4 |
| NFO Infratest | 20–21 Aug 2003 | ~1,000 | 37 | 40 | 5 | 11 | 4 | – | 3 | 3 |
| Emnid | 20 Aug 2003 | 1,002 | 35 | 38 | 6 | 13 | 5 | – | 3 | 3 |
| Emnid | 4–5 Feb 2003 | 1,000 | 26 | 42 | 12 | 13 | 5 | – | 2 | 16 |
| Psephos | 25 Oct 2002 | 1,003 | 36 | 34 | 8 | 13 | 5 | – | 4 | 2 |
| Emnid | 7 Feb 2002 | ? | 37 | 32 | 12 | 9 | 6 | – | 4 | 5 |
| Emnid | 2–4 Feb 2002 | 1,008 | 40 | 32 | 10 | 11 | 4 | – | 3 | 8 |
| Psephos | 2 Feb 2002 | 1,003 | 36 | 32 | 14 | 9 | 5 | – | 4 | 4 |
| Forsa | 22–23 Jan 2002 | 1,001 | 35 | 31 | 15 | 10 | 4 | – | 5 | 4 |
| 2001 state election | 23 Sep 2001 | – | 36.5 | 26.2 | 19.4 | 8.6 | 5.1 | 0.2 | 4.0 | 10.3 |

== Election result ==
Summary of the 29 February 2004 election results for the Hamburg Parliament
| Party | Votes | % | +/- | Seats | +/- | Seats % |
|---|---|---|---|---|---|---|
| Christian Democratic Union (CDU) | 389,170 | 47.2 | ▲21.0 | 63 | ▲30 | 52.1 |
| Social Democratic Party (SPD) | 251,441 | 30.5 | ▼6.0 | 41 | ▼5 | 33.9 |
| Green Alternative List (GAL) | 101,227 | 12.3 | ▲3.7 | 17 | ▲6 | 14.0 |
| Pro Deutsche Mitte – Initiative Pro D-Mark (Pro DM) | 25,763 | 3.1 | ▲2.9 | 0 | ±0 | 0 |
| Free Democratic Party (FDP) | 23,373 | 2.8 | ▼2.3 | 0 | ▼6 | 0 |
| Rainbow – For a new left (REGENBOGEN) | 9,200 | 1.1 | ▼0.6 | 0 | ±0 | 0 |
| The Grays – Gray Panthers (GRAUEN) | 8,878 | 1.1 | ▲1.1 | 0 | ±0 | 0 |
| Others | 15,265 | 1.9 | | 0 | ▼25 | 0 |
| Total | 824,317 | 100.0 | | 121 | ±0 | |
| Voter turnout | | 68.7 | ▼2.4 | | | |

Popular Vote
| CDU | 47.21% |
| SPD | 30.50% |
| GAL | 12.28% |
| PRO DM | 3.13% |
| FDP | 2.84% |
| Other | 4.04% |

Bürgerschaft seats
| CDU | 52.07% |
| SPD | 33.88% |
| GAL | 14.05% |

== See also ==
- Hamburg state elections in the Weimar Republic
- 2008 Hamburg state election
