= 2008 Hamburg state election =

State election in Hamburg, Germany

- 24 February 2008

All 121 seats in the Hamburg Parliament 61 seats needed for a majority
- Turnout: 777,531 (63.5%) ▼5.2%
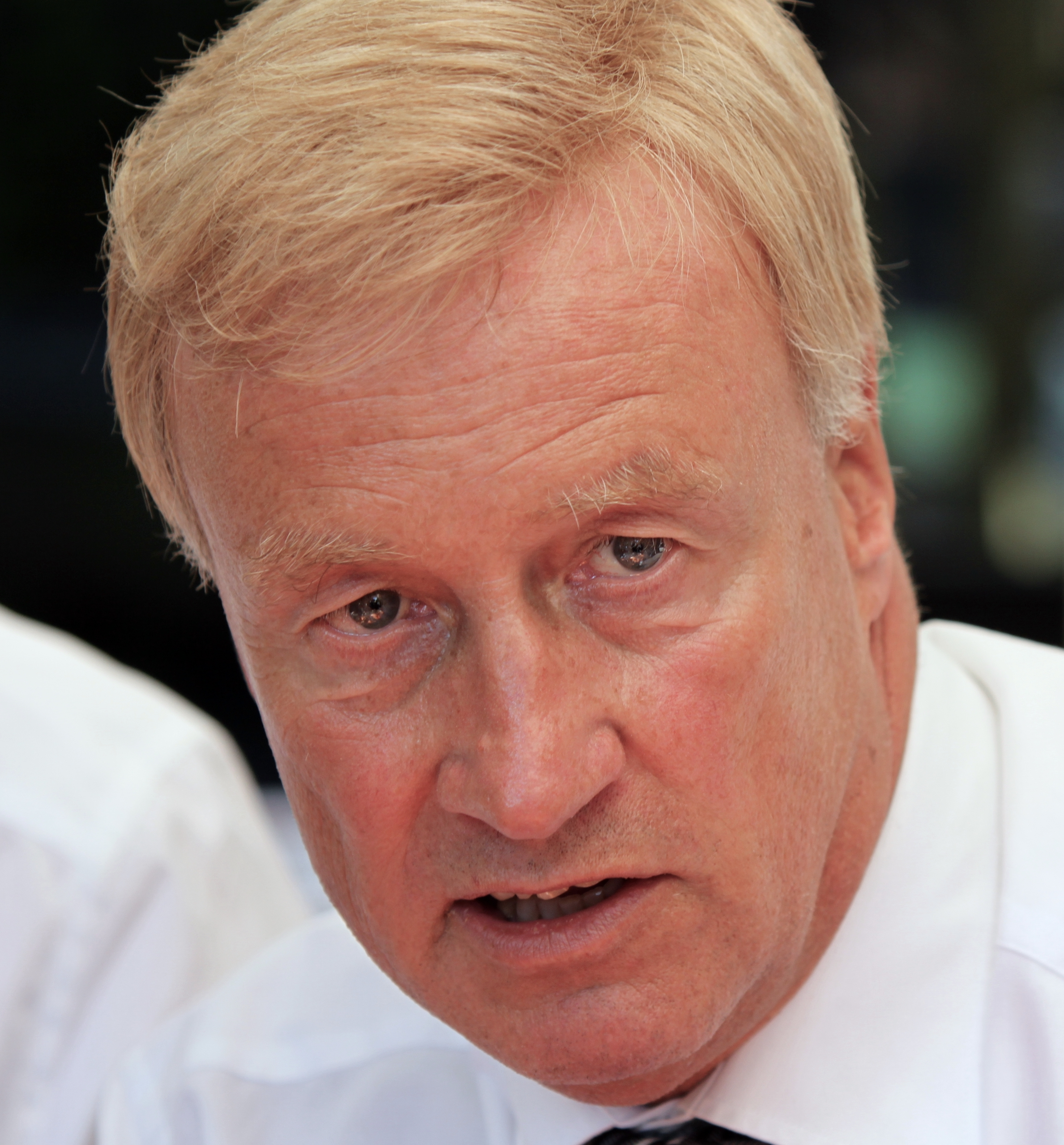

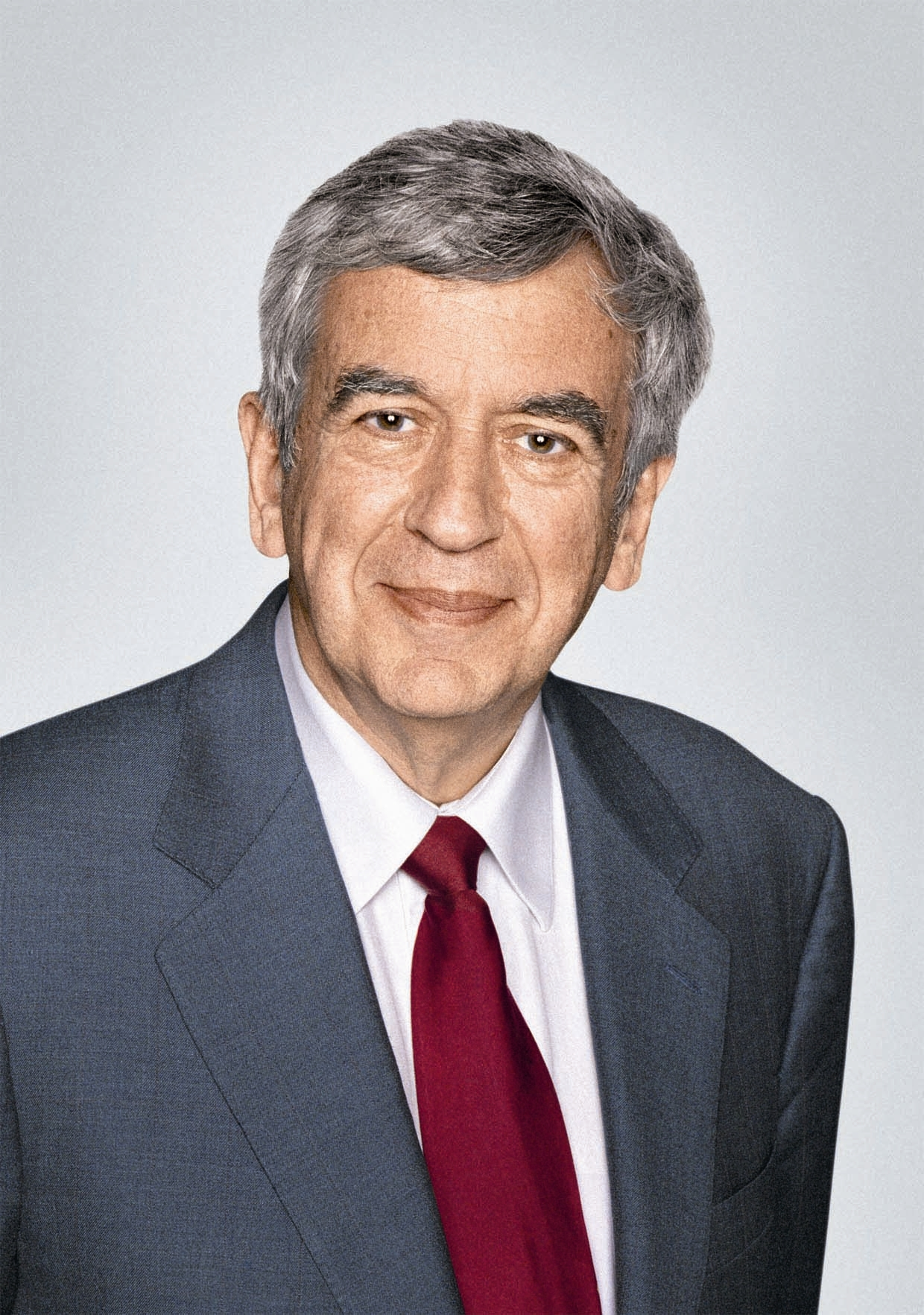

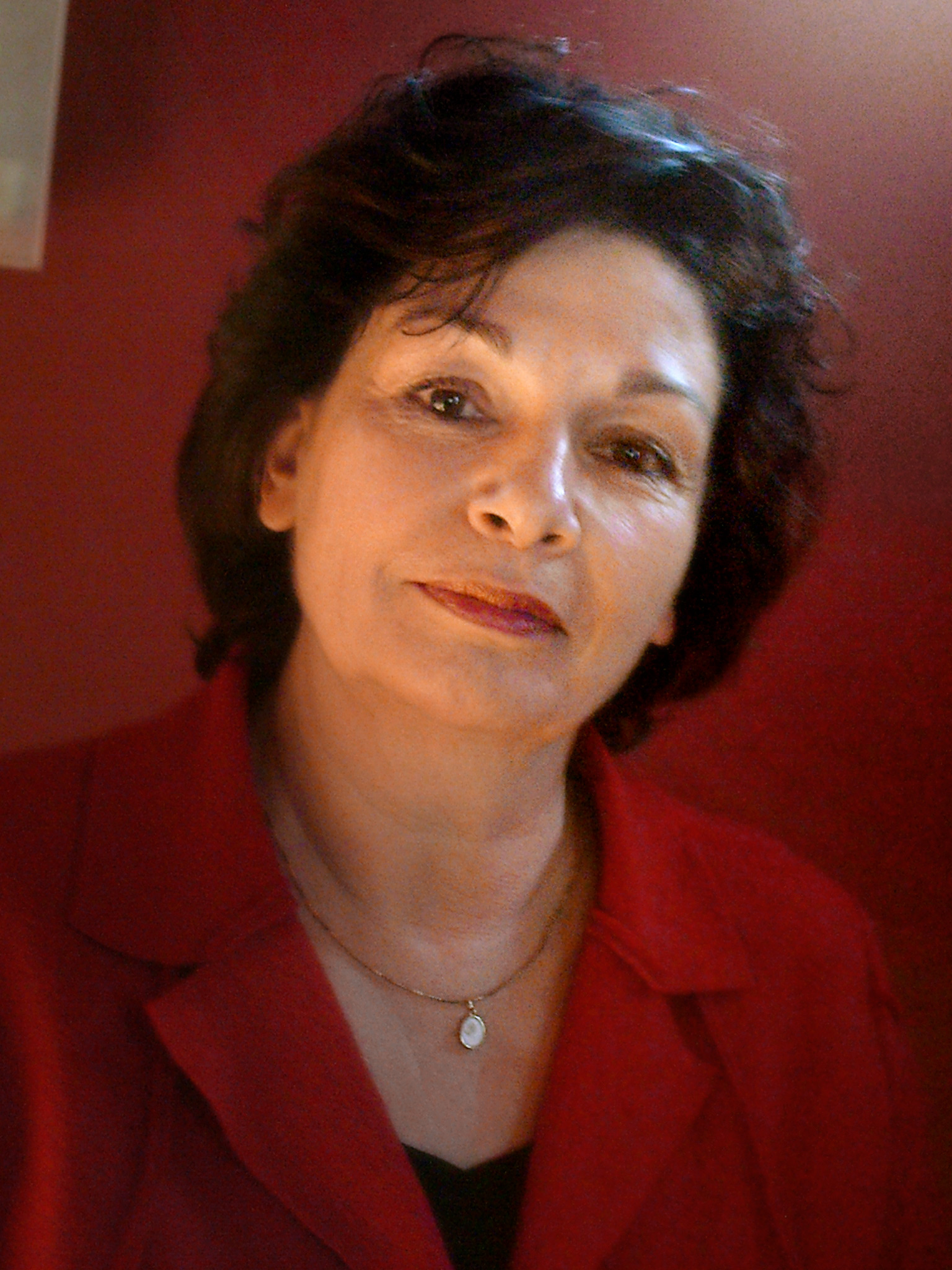

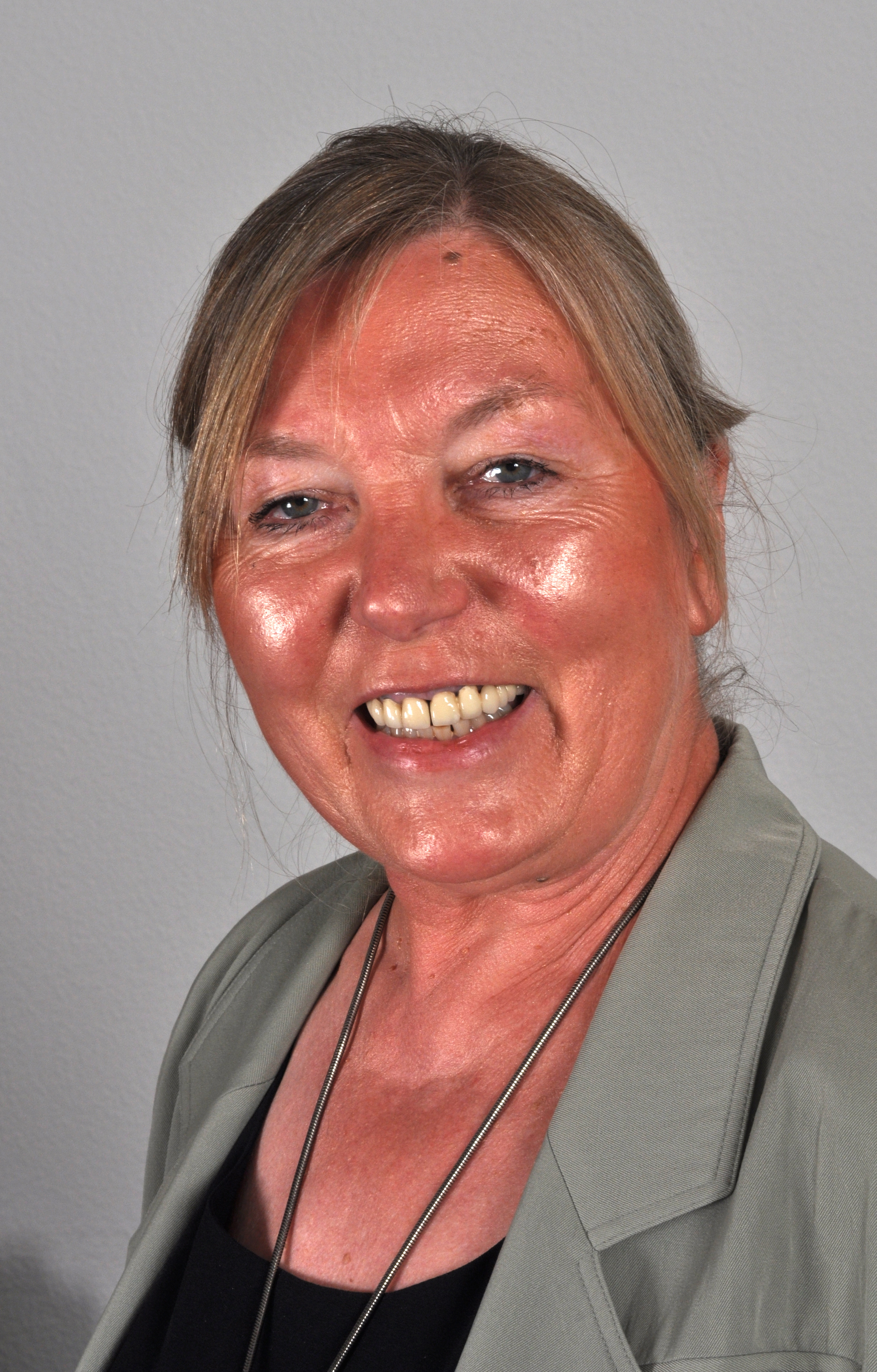
	First party	Second party
Leader	Ole von Beust	Michael Naumann
Party	CDU	SPD
Last election	63 seats, 47.2%	41 seats, 30.5%
Seats won	56	45
Seat change	▼7	▲4
Popular vote	331,067	265,516
Percentage	42.6%	34.1%
Swing	▼4.6%	▲3.6%
	Third party	Fourth party
Leader	Christa Goetsch	Dora Heyenn
Party	Greens	Left
Last election	17 seats, 12.3%	Did not run
Seats won	12	8
Seat change	▼5	▲8
Popular vote	74,472	50,132
Percentage	9.6%	6.4%
Swing	▼2.7%	▲6.4%
Mayor before election
Ole von Beust
CDU
Elected Mayor
Ole von Beust
CDU

The 2008 Hamburg state election was held on 24 February 2008 to elect the members of the 19th Hamburg Parliament. The incumbent Christian Democratic Union led by First Mayor Ole von Beust government lost its majority. The CDU subsequently formed a coalition government with the Green Alternative List. This was the first time the CDU had formed a state government with the Greens in Germany.

== Parties ==
The table below lists parties represented in the 18th Hamburg Parliament.

Name		Ideology	Leader(s)	2004 result	
Name		Ideology	Leader(s)	Votes (%)	Seats
CDU	Christian Democratic Union of Germany; Christlich Demokratische Union Deutschlands	Christian democracy	Ole von Beust	47.2%	63 / 121
SPD	Social Democratic Party of Germany; Sozialdemokratische Partei Deutschlands	Social democracy	Michael Naumann	30.5%	41 / 121
GAL	Green Alternative List; Grün-Alternative-Liste Hamburg	Green politics	Christa Goetsch	12.3%	17 / 121

== Opinion polling ==
Polling firm	Fieldwork date	Sample size	CDU	SPD	GAL	FDP	Linke	Others	Lead
2008 state election	24 Feb 2008	–	42.6	34.1	9.6	4.8	6.4	2.5	8.5
GMS	18–20 Feb 2008	1,002	40	35	9	4	8	4	5
election.de	14–19 Feb 2008	1,010	41	35	10	4	6	4	6
Psephos	12–16 Feb 2008	1,006	42	34	9	5	7	3	8
Infratest dimap	14–15 Feb 2008	1,000	39	35	9	5	9	3	4
Emnid	5–12 Feb 2008	1,000	42	32	11	5	7	?	10
Forschungsgruppe Wahlen	12–14 Feb 2008	1,018	41	34	10	5	7	3	7
Infratest dimap	12–13 Feb 2008	1,000	39	35	10	5	8	3	4
Infratest dimap	29–30 Jan 2008	1,000	41	33	10	5	7	4	8
Psephos	18–23 Jan 2008	1,003	42	36	10	3.5	5	3.5	6
election.de	16–22 Jan 2008	750	37	38	13	5	6	1	1
Infratest dimap	2–4 Jan 2008	1,000	40	35	11	4	6	4	5
Emnid	10 Dec–2 Jan 2008	600	42	31	13	5	7	2	11
AMR Düsseldorf	29 Dec 2007	1,000	42	33	12	4	7	2	9
Infratest dimap	7–12 Dec 2007	1,000	41	34	12	3	7	3	7
TNS Infratest	4–7 Dec 2007	1,216	40	33	13	3	7	?	7
Psephos	3–7 Dec 2007	1,007	44	33	12	3	5	3	11
Emnid	22 Nov–5 Dec 2007	603	41	31	12	5	8	3	10
Infratest dimap	3–5 Sep 2007	1,000	42	32	13	4	7	2	10
TNS Infratest	13–15 Aug 2007	1,001	42	33	13	3	6	3	9
Psephos	28 Jun–3 Jul 2007	1,005	45	30	14	3	5	3	15
Forsa	14–18 May 2007	1,001	41	29	16	4	6	4	12
Emnid	12–14 Mar 2007	1,000	44	32	12	5	4	3	12
Psephos	26–27 Feb 2007	958	45	31	14	3	3	4	14
Emnid	5–7 Feb 2007	1,000	43	32	13	3	4	5	11
Psephos	5 Jan 2007	1,002	44	33	13	3	4	3	11
Infratest dimap	19–22 Oct 2006	1,000	35	36	14	6	4	5	1
Forsa	1–8 Aug 2006	1,001	44	27	14	5	5	5	17
Psephos	5 May 2006	1,004	45	33	12	2	2.5	5.5	12
Psephos	17 Feb 2006	1,005	47	32	12	3	3	3	15
Emnid	6–8 Feb 2006	1,000	46	33	13	3	3	2	13
Psephos	9 Jan 2006	721	46	31	13	3	4	3	15
Psephos	3–6 Sep 2005	1,011	49	30	12	3	3	3	19
Psephos	2–3 Aug 2005	1,000	48	28	14	2	5	3	20
Psephos	21–24 Apr 2005	1,002	46	29	14	4	–	7	17
Psephos	21–24 Feb 2005	1,005	48	29	14	3	–	6	19
Psephos	21–23 Oct 2004	1,001	48	28	14	4	–	6	20
Emnid	12 Aug 2004	?	48	25	17	3	–	7	23
Psephos	18–22 Jun 2004	1,007	50	25	16	4	–	5	25
2004 state election	29 Feb 2004	–	47.2	30.5	12.3	2.8	–	7.1	16.7

== Election result ==
Summary of the 24 February 2008 election results for the Hamburg Parliament
Party	Votes	%	+/-	Seats	+/-	Seats %
Christian Democratic Union (CDU)	331,067	42.6	▼4.6	56	▼7	46.3
Social Democratic Party (SPD)	265,516	34.1	▲3.6	45	▲4	37.2
Green Alternative List (GAL)	74,472	9.6	▼2.7	12	▼5	9.9
The Left (Linke)	50,132	6.4	▲6.4	8	▲8	6.6
Free Democratic Party (FDP)	36,953	4.8	▲2.0	0	±0	0
German People's Union (DVU)	6,354	0.8	▲0.8	0	±0	0
Others	13,037	1.7		0	±0	0
Total	777,531	100.0		121	±0	
Voter turnout		63.5	▼5.2			

Popular Vote
CDU	42.58%
SPD	34.15%
GAL	9.58%
DIE LINKE	6.45%
FDP	4.75%
Other	2.49%

Bürgerschaft seats
CDU	46.28%
SPD	37.19%
GAL	9.92%
DIE LINKE	6.61%

== See also ==
- Elections in Hamburg
- Hamburg state elections in the Weimar Republic
