= Christa Goetsch =

German politician

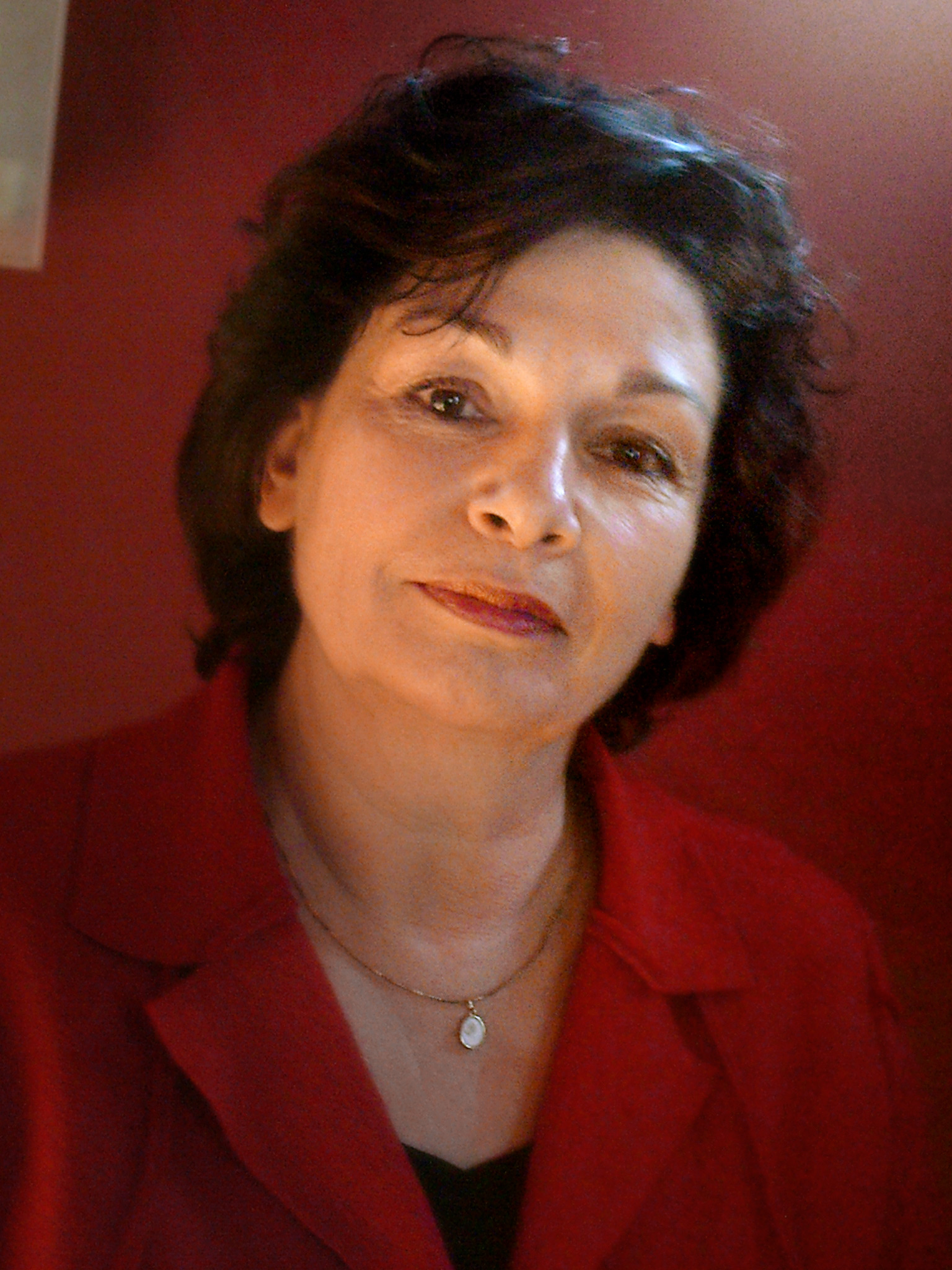
Christa Goetsch in 2008

Christa Goetsch (born 28 August 1952 in Bonn) is a German politician of the Alliance '90/The Greens party, member of the Hamburg Parliament, and from 2008-2010 was a Senator and 119th Second Mayor of Hamburg.

== Early life and career ==
Goetsch finished her schooling in Munich and Essen in 1971 with the Abitur. In Frankfurt am Main, she studied to be a chemistry and biology teacher. From 1980 to 2002 she worked as a teacher at the Theodor-Haubach School in Hamburg-Altona-Nord, an integrated primary and junior high school with a support centre for talented young people from immigrant backgrounds.

== Political career ==
Since 1995 Goetsch has been a member of Alliance 90/The Greens. In the 1997 state election, she moved to the Hamburg Parliament, where she served as her parliamentary group's spokeswoman on education and educational policies. In 2002 she became chair of the GAL Group (Hamburg state branch of Alliance 90/The Greens). She sat on the Study Commission on School Development, the Petition Committee, School Committee and the Special Committee for Neglected Children.

Goetsch was a leading candidate for her party in the 2008 state election. She led the coalition negotiations with the Hamburg Christian Democratic Union. From 7 May 2008 to the early release of GAL-members by the First Mayor Christoph Ahlhaus on 29 November 2010, Goetsch was a member of the Senate of the Free and Hanseatic City of Hamburg. There Senator Goetsch was President of the Authority for School and Vocational Education and Deputy Mayor in the first black-green coalition at the national level.

== Other activities ==
- Heinrich Böll Foundation, Member of the General Assembly

== Personal life ==
Goetsch is married, has one son and lives in the district of Ottensen.
