= St. Pauli Piers =

Jetty in the Port of Hamburg

St. Pauli Landungsbrücken St. Pauli Landing Bridges
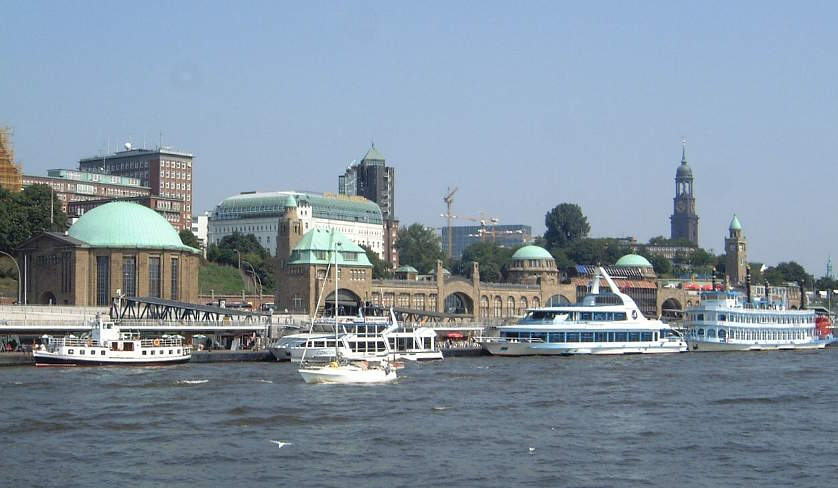
- The piers' waterfront seen towards St. Michaelis

General information
- Location: Bei den St. Pauli-Landungsbrücken; 20359 Hamburg, Germany
- Coordinates: 53°32′46″N 09°58′00″E
- Operator: HADAG Fährdienst AG
- Line: 61 62 68 72 73 75
- Platforms: 10 bridges (20 berths)
- Connections: Landungsbrücken (100 m); Landungsbrücken (100 m)

Construction
- Structure type: 10 floating piers (pontoons)
- Accessible: Yes (Note: Depending on tidal conditions, the landing bridges may be to steep to comply with disabled accessibility.)
- Architect: Raabe & Wöhlecke

History
- Opened: 1839
- Rebuilt: 1907–1909

Key dates
- May: Hafengeburtstag (since 1977)
- July–August: Hamburg Cruise Days and Blue Port (both since 2008)
Location
- Location within Hamburg Location within Germany

The St. Pauli Piers (German: St. Pauli Landungsbrücken, often only referred to as Landungsbrücken; German pronunciation: [ˈlandʊŋsˌbʁʏkŋ̍]), is the largest landing site in the Port of Hamburg, Germany, and also one of Hamburg's major tourist attractions. Other English language translations include St. Pauli Landing Stages or St. Pauli Landing Bridges.

The piers are located in the St. Pauli area of Hamburg, between the lower harbour and the Fischmarkt (Fish Market), on the banks of the Elbe river. The Landungsbrücken today form a central transportation hub, with S-Bahn, U-Bahn and ferry stations, and are also a major tourist magnet with numerous restaurants and departure points for harbour pleasure boats. There is an entrance to the Old Elbe tunnel at the western end of the Landungsbrücken. The eastern end of the building complex is marked by the Pegelturm (water level tower). Halfway up the tower, there is a water level indicator built into the wall, which indicates the current stage of the tides.

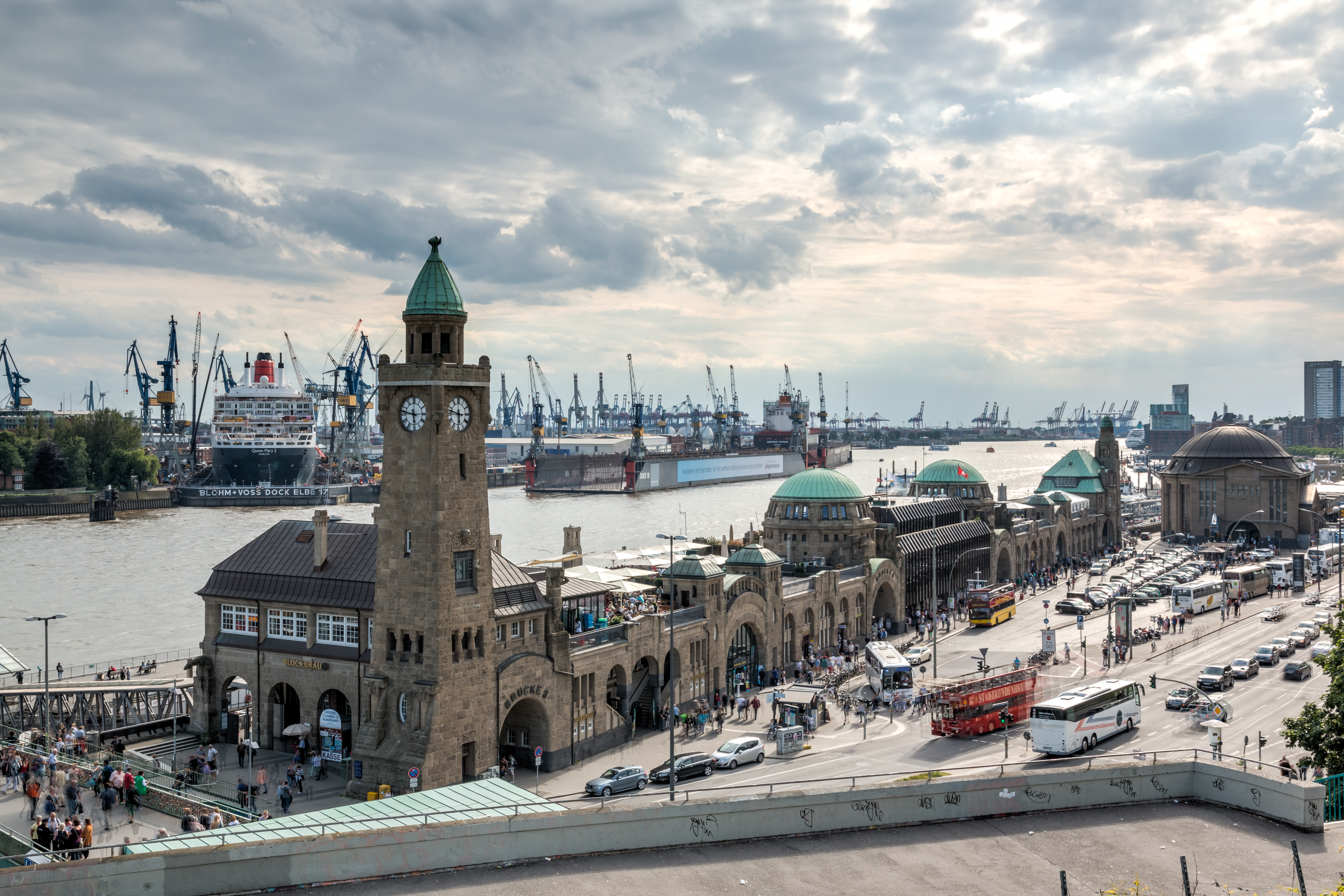
Landungsbrücken building

== Shipping piers ==
The first pier here was built in 1839 at what was then the edge of the harbour. It served as a terminal for steamships, which could be relatively easily filled with coal here. The pier ensured a sufficient security distance from the city, since coal presented a fire risk. The current piers built in 1907 consist of floating pontoons, which are accessible from land by ten movable bridges.

The 688-metre-long (2,257 ft) landing place originally served the passenger steamers of the overseas lines. Among others, the great Hapag-Lloyd liners landed here. Today only HADAG ferries, harbour tour ships and motor launches, passenger ships serving the lower Elbe, and catamarans to Stade and Helgoland still travel to the piers. Ships travel from here daily to the musical island hosting a venue devoted to performances of "The Lion King".

Preceding station	HADAG	Following station
Altona Fischmarkt towards Neuhof	61	Terminus
Altona Fischmarkt towards Finkenwerder	62 weekends only	Terminus
Teufelsbrück towards Airbuswerk	68 weekday peak hours only	Terminus
Terminus	72	Arningstraße towards Elbphilharmonie
Terminus	73 weekdays only	Theater im Hafen towards Ernst-August-Schleuse
Terminus	75 weekdays only	Steinwerder Terminus
Neumühlen towards Willkomm-Höft (Wendel)	Elb-Hüpfer weekends only	Elbphilharmonie One-way operation
Ferry services
Ernst-August-Schleuse toward BallinStadt	Maritime Circle Line	Cap San Diego; One-way operation
Willkomm-Höft (Wedel) toward Heligoland	FRS Helgoline season service only	Terminus

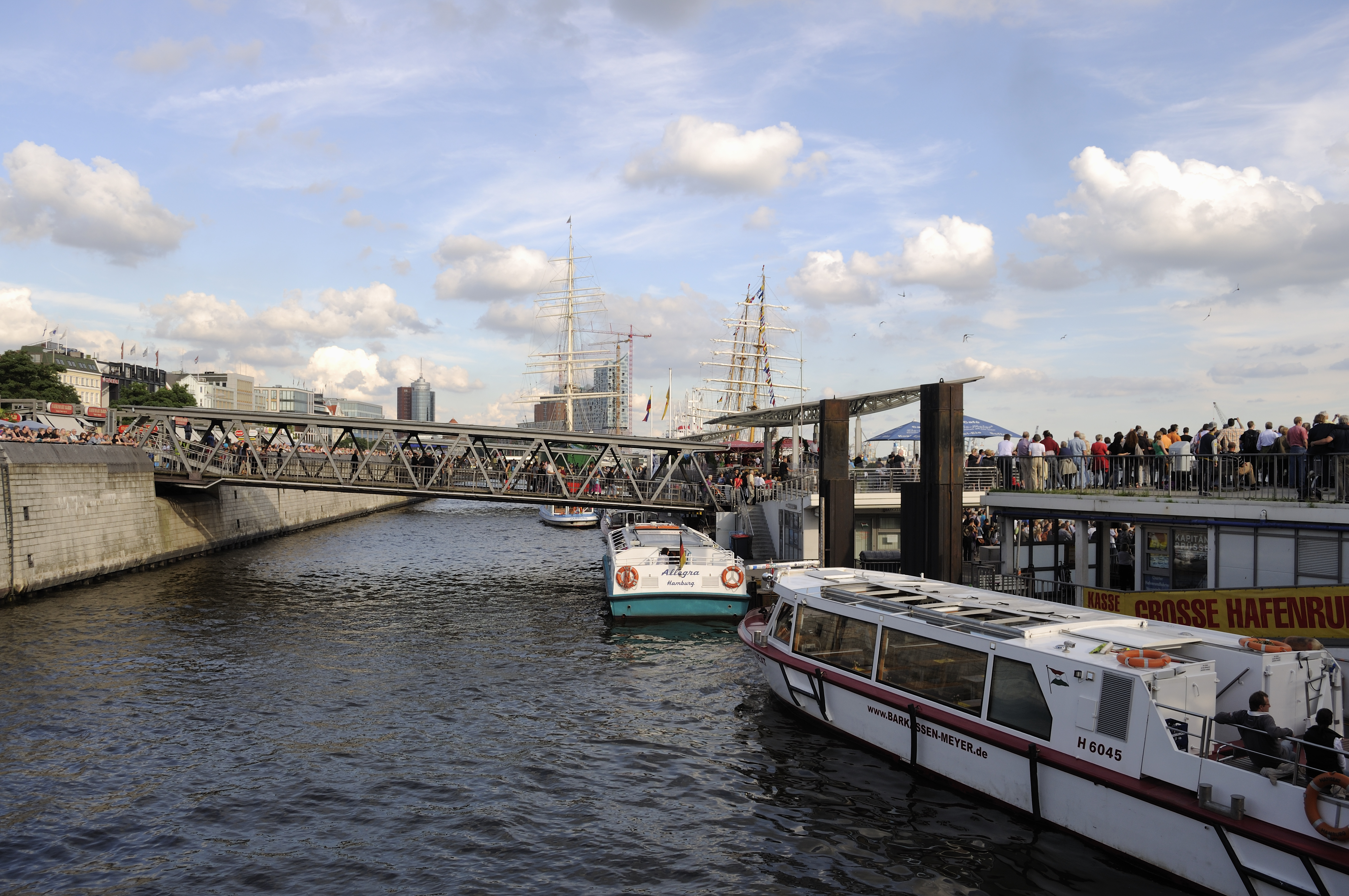
Shipping pier

The old piers were destroyed during the Second World War, so today's pontoons were rebuilt between 1953 and 1955. The last section destroyed in the War, between bridges 2 and 3, was not rebuilt until 1976. During the modernisation begun in 1999, the roofing and lighting were updated. Part of this modernisation is planned to include replacing bridge 7.

=== Cultural monument ===
The terminal building, built from volcanic tuff, and the piers were constructed between 1907 and 1909 in the same location as the old Landungsbrücken. It was designed as a representative shipping station by the architectural company of Raabe & Wöhlecke for the department of river and harbour construction of the construction deputation. With its length of 205 m, its numerous gateways to the ships' piers, its domes and towers, it sets a structural accent. The architectural sculptures were created by Arthur Bock.

The complex was classified as a historical monument on 15 September 2003.

== Public transport interchange ==
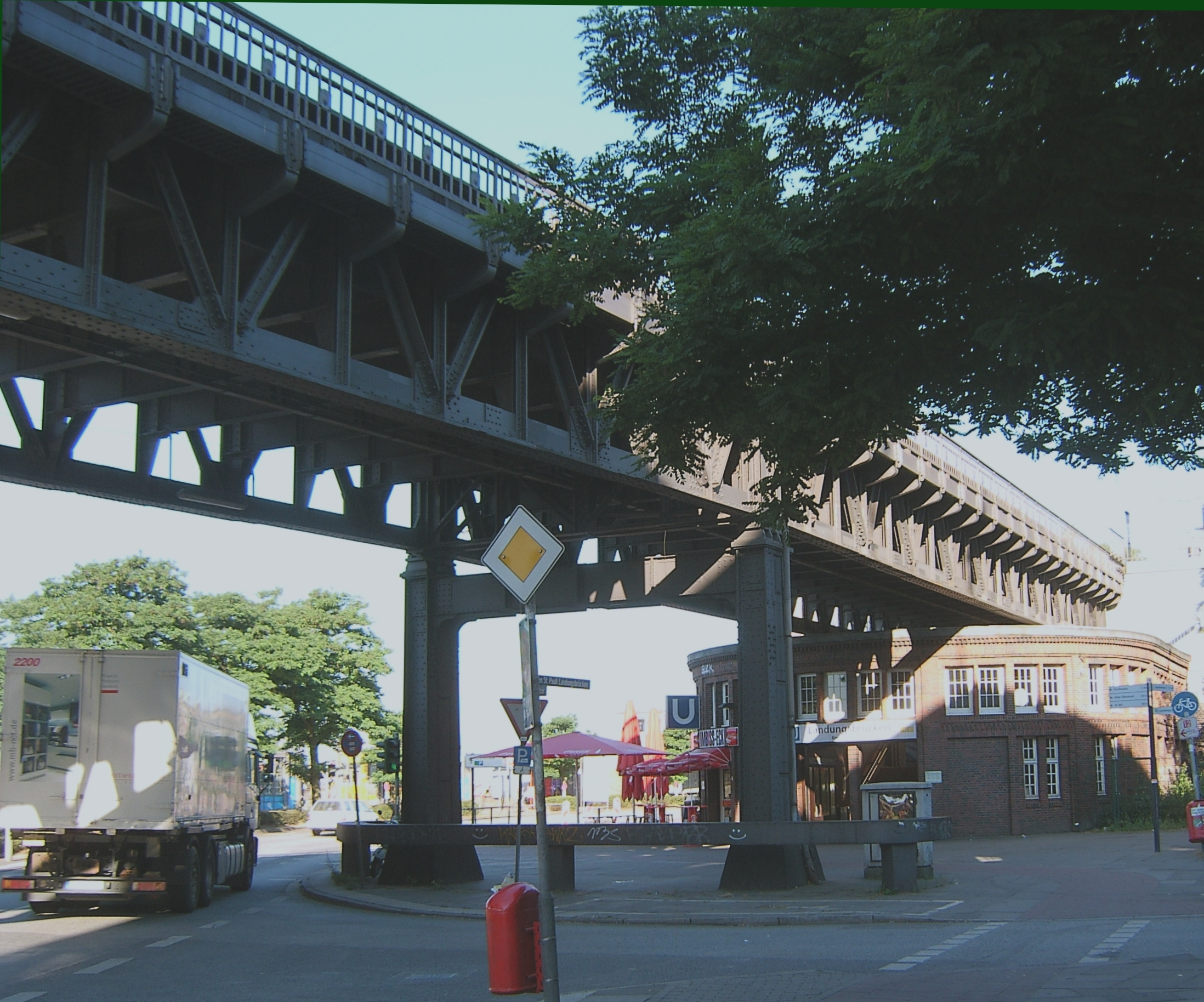
U-Bahn entrance, "Hafentor"

A connection with the S-Bahn and U-Bahn is provided through Landungsbrücken station.

== Stammsiel ==
One of Hamburg's oldest and largest sewerage systems is near the Landungsbrücken. It is part of the "Stadtwasserkunst" designed by William Lindley in 1842. The Geest-Stammsiel collects sewage from far parts of the city before it is transported under the Elbe to the main purification plant Köhlbrandhöft on the opposite side of the Elbe, by means of a pumping station about 100 m upstream of the old Elbe tunnel. The sluice can be travelled by boat. For the rowing trips of Kaiser Willhelm II, a separate underground dock was constructed, viewable by appointment.
