= Maritime Circle Line =

Travel and holiday companies of Germany

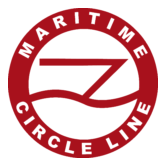
- Company type: Private
- Industry: Transport
- Founded: 2007
- Headquarters: Hamburg, Germany
- Area served: Elbe
- Services: Passenger transportation
- Website: maritime-circle-line.de

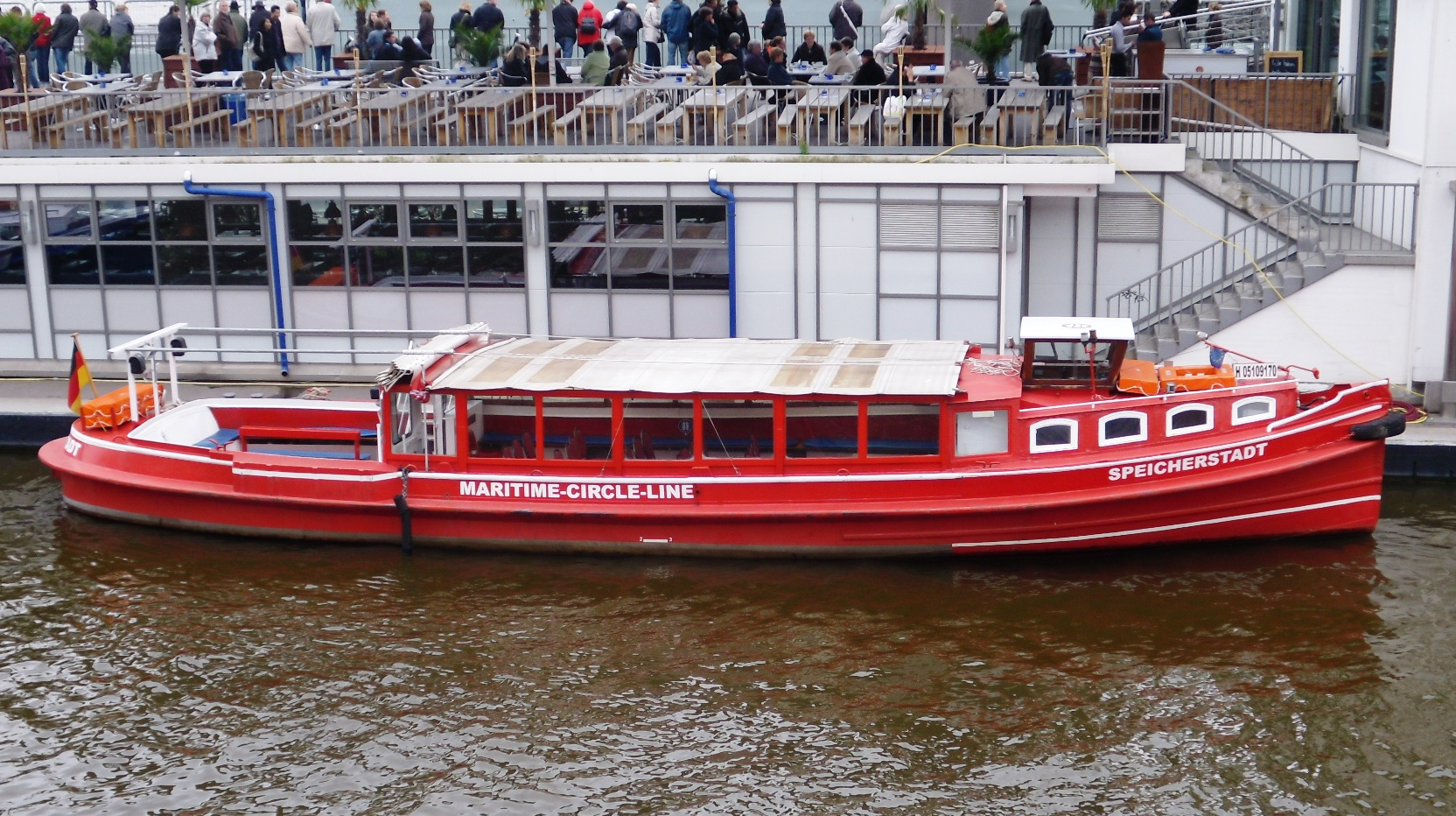
Speicherstadt at St. Pauli Piers

The Maritime Circle Line (MCL) is a private harbor cruise line and operator in the Port of Hamburg, Germany, established by Gregor Mogi in 2007. The ferry service is operated on a scheduled timetable, connecting a number of Hamburg's maritime visitor attractions in the eastern port area.

== Route and stations ==
The Maritime Circle Line is a one-way circle line with eight stops, offering three tours daily from April to September, while the service is less regular during the winter season. The total travel time is some 2 h, with travel time between stops varying between 10 and 20 minutes. The tour can be commenced at any of the eight stops.

- St. Pauli Piers (Landungsbrücken)
- Ernst-August-Schleuse
- BallinStadt Emigration Museum
- Hafenmuseum Hamburg
- HafenCity (Internationales Maritimes Museum)
- Elbphilharmonie (Traditionsschiffhafen)
- Speicherstadt
- MS Cap San Diego
