= HADAG =

German local public transport company

HADAG Seetouristik und Fährdienst AG
- Company type: AG
- Industry: Inland passenger water transport water transport
- Founded: 1888
- Headquarters: Hamburg, Germany
- Area served: Hamburg
- Services: Public transport
- Net income: € 1.5 m
- Owner: Free and Hanseatic City of Hamburg (100%)
- Number of employees: 75 +15 trainees
- Parent: Hamburger Hochbahn AG
- Subsidiaries: HADAG Verkehrsdienste
- Website: www.hadag.de

The HADAG (full name HADAG Seetouristik und Fährdienst AG, literally "HADAG Sea-tourism and Ferry service") is a local public transport company in Hamburg, Germany. It owns and operates passenger ferries across the Elbe River, overseen by and integrated into the network of Hamburger Verkehrsverbund (HVV). In 2013, 10.6 million passenger journeys were made on the HADAG network.

In the 1950s the company operated ferries from Hamburg to England, and in the 1980s, the cruise ship MS Astor.

== History ==
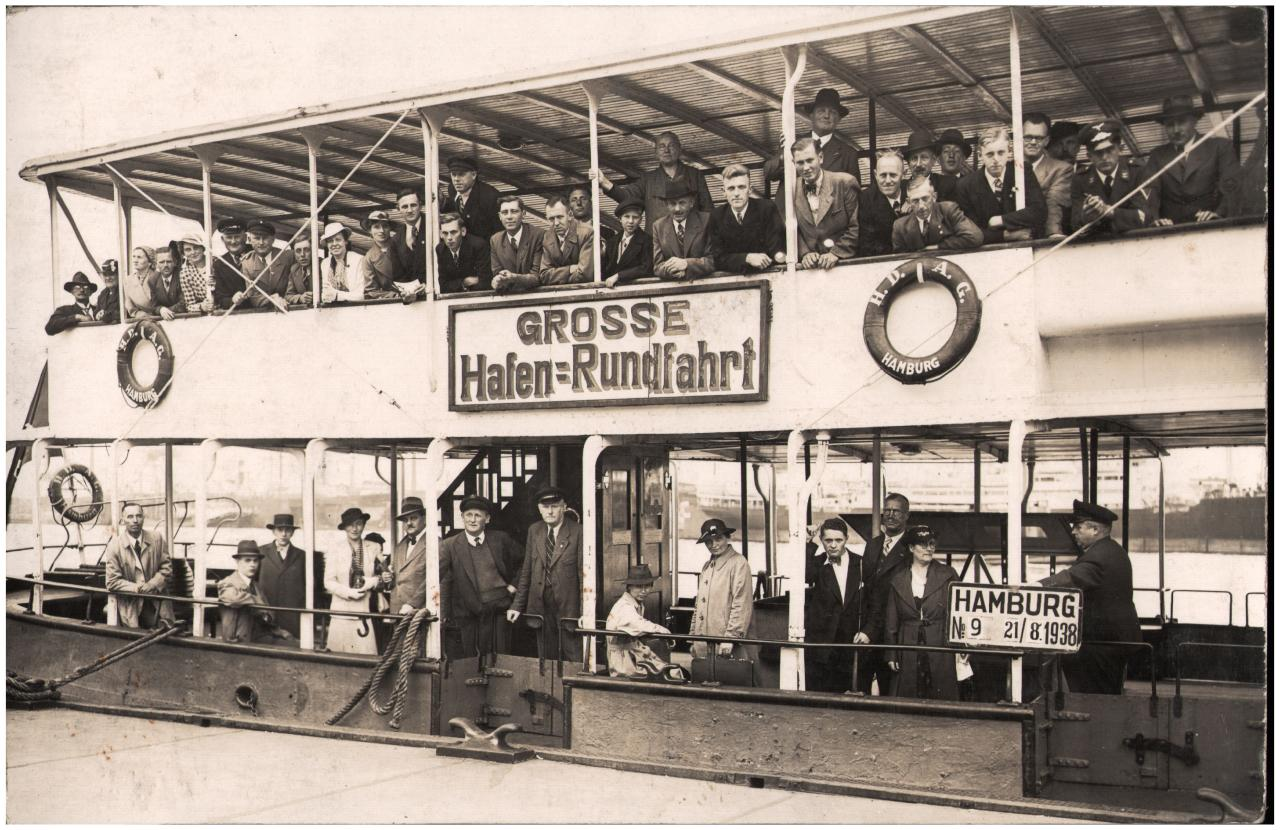
HADAG passengers on board a 'Große Hafenrundfahrt' (21 August 1938)

The Hafen-Dampfschifffahrt AG (HADAG) was founded on 8 August 1888, and the Free and Hanseatic City of Hamburg granted the concession to operate ferries in the Port of Hamburg. In 1897, the HADAG owned 47 ferries and took over the smaller Jollenführer Dampfer GmbH. With opening of the Elbe tunnel in 1911, the HADAG line Landungsbrücken — Steinwerder lost 259,000 passengers p.a..

In 1918, with the end of the concession, the HADAG wanted to rise the fare price. The city of Hamburg refused and the company was in danger of liquidation. On 23 October 1918, the city of Hamburg acquired the HADAG. Later it became a subsidiary for the Hamburger Hochbahn (HHA). In 1928 the HHA and HADAG established a shared fare for the trains, trams, and buses of the HHA and the ferries of the HADAG.

In the 1950s, the HADAG operated a ferry to England and to the islands Heligoland and Sylt. In 1966, the last steam ferries were taken out of service. In 1982, HADAG closed the ferry line from Landungsbrücken to the Heligoland island, and started a line from Cuxhaven, with a combined fare with Deutsche Bundesbahn, in 1983. Until 1983, the HADAG owned the cruise ship MS Astor.

== Operations ==
HADAG Seetouristik und Fährdienst
- Locale: Hamburg, Germany
- Waterway: Elbe
- System length: 26.3 km
- No. of lines: 8
- No. of vessels: 23 ferries with diesel drive
- No. of terminals: 21 landing bridges
- Daily ridership: 10.6 mio. passengers p. a. (2013)
- Website: www.hadag.de

The HADAG runs public transport ferries and pleasure boats on the rivers Elbe and Alster. The public transport is supervised by the Hamburger Verkehrsverbund.

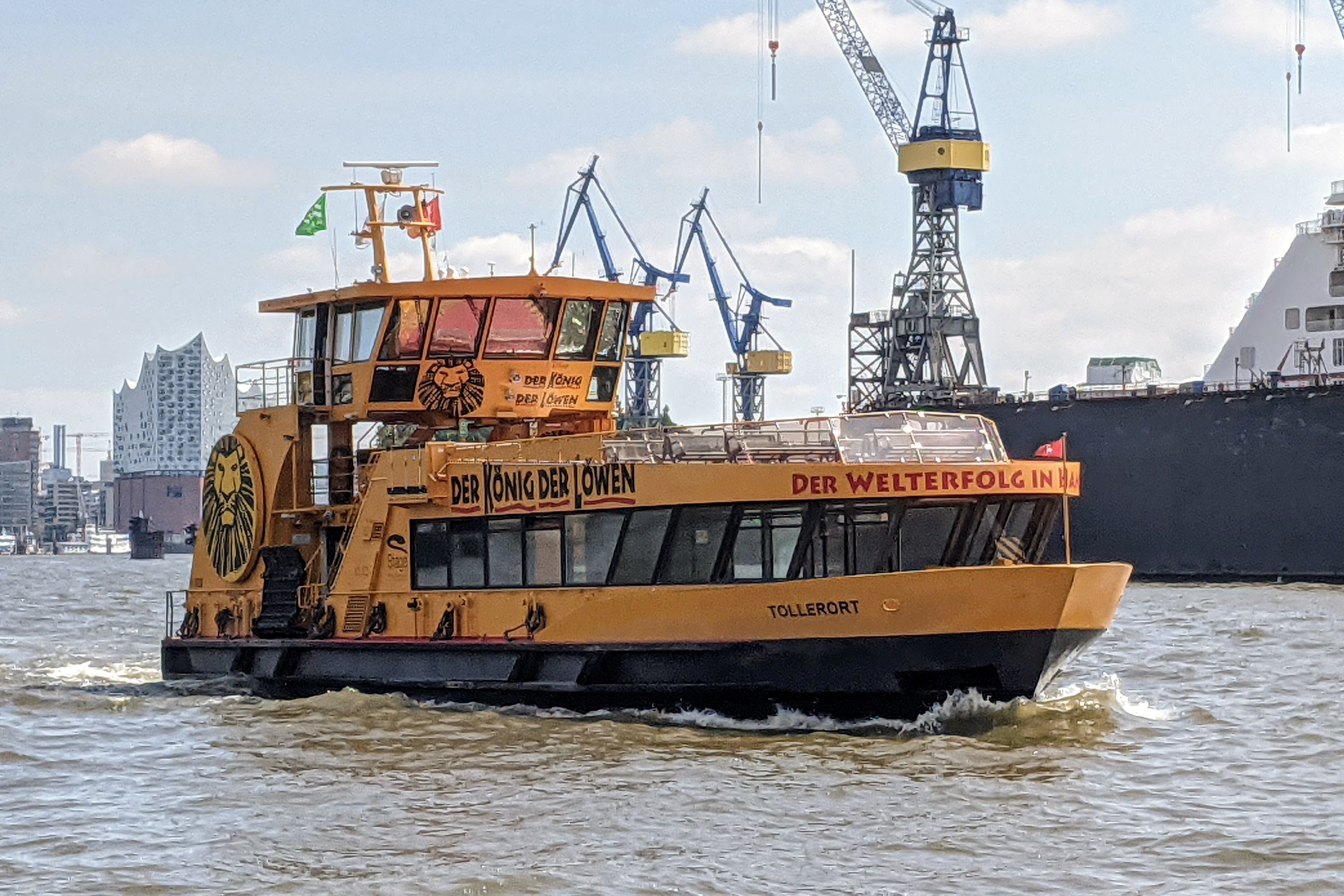
Ferry Tollerort: one of the typical flat-iron-shaped ferries (May 2022)

=== Scheduled harbour ferries ===
Line	Route
	St. Pauli Landungsbrücken (Brücke 2) – Altona (Fischmarkt) – Dockland – Waltershof – Neuhof (mo. to fr.)
	St. Pauli Landungsbrücken (Brücke 3) – Altona (Fischmarkt) – Dockland – Neumühlen / Övelgönne – (Bubendey-Ufer) – Finkenwerder
	Finkenwerder – Rüschpark – Teufelsbrück
	Teufelsbrück – Airbus Hamburg (mo. to fr., sometimes from St. Pauli Landungsbrücken)
	St. Pauli Landungsbrücken (Brücke 1) – (Arningstraße) – Elbphilharmonie
	St. Pauli Landungsbrücken (Brücke 1) – Theater im Hafen – Norderelbstraße – Argentinienbrücke – Ernst-August-Schleuse (Wilhelmsburg) (mo. to fr.)
	St. Pauli Landungsbrücken (Brücke 1) – Steinwerder (mo. to fr.)
	Blankenese – Neuenfelde, Este-Sperrwerk – Cranz (currently suspended)

Lines of HADAG ferries in the Port of Hamburg

=== Non-scheduled harbour cruises ===
Line	Route
	St. Pauli Landungsbrücken (Brücke 1) – Theater im Hafen (only at theater shows, not in HVV)
	St. Pauli Landungsbrücken – (HafenCity – Köhlbrand – Waltershofer Hafen (Container Terminal Burchardkai)) (Harbour tour with no stops, not in HVV)
	St. Pauli Landungsbrücken – Neumühlen – Teufelsbrück – Blankenese – Willkomm-Höft (Wedel) – Blankenese – Teufelsbrück – Elbphilharmonie – St. Pauli Landungsbrücken ("EH" for Elb-Hüpfer or Elbe Hopper, weekends and bank holidays only, not in HVV)

== Accidents and Incidents ==
- On the 19 April 2012, a group of 8 Kurdistan Workers' Party supporters briefly hijacked the ferry Elbmeile on the Elbe river with 60 passengers onboard before being arrested by police. There were no injuries.
- On the 9 February 2019, the container ship Ever Given brushed against the ferry Finkenwerder which was moored at the pier in Blankenese. The much smaller ferry, at the time without passengers onboard, was seriously damaged.
- On the 17 February 2022, during a storm, a large wave burst one of the passenger deck windows onboard the ferry Tollerort. Three people were injured.
- On the early morning of 20 January 2025, the ferry Övelgönne collided with a barge and tugboat in fog. The accident tore open a side of the passenger deck. 12 people were injured, one of them seriously.

== See also ==
- Transport in Hamburg
- List of rivers of Hamburg
