= Elbphilharmonie =

Concert hall in Hamburg, Germany

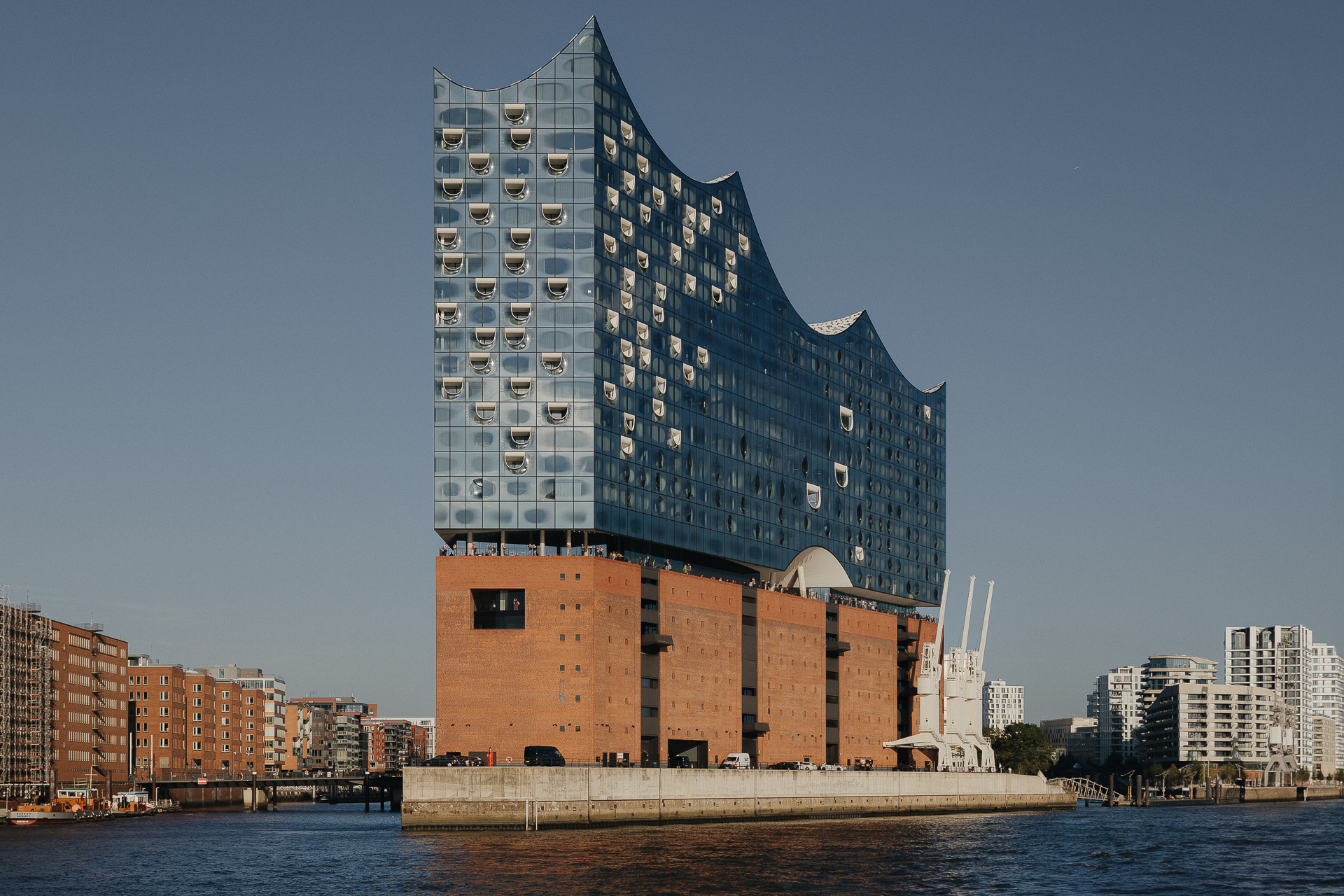
- Interactive map of Elbphilharmonie
- Address: Platz der Deutschen Einheit; 20457 Hamburg, Germany
- Coordinates: 53°32′29″N 9°59′03″E
- Capacity: 2,100 (Großer Saal)
- Type: Concert hall
- Public transit: Baumwall (450 m); 72 Elbphilharmonie (50 m); Überseequartier (950 m); Am Kaiserkai (150 m)

Construction
- Opened: 11 January 2017
- Cost: 866 million €
- Architect: Herzog & de Meuron

Website
- elbphilharmonie.de

The Elbphilharmonie (German pronunciation: [ˈɛlpfɪlhaʁmoˌniː]; "Elbe Philharmonic Hall"), popularly nicknamed Elphi, is a concert hall in the HafenCity quarter of Hamburg, Germany, on the Grasbrook peninsula of the Elbe River.

The new construction resembles a hoisted sail, water wave, iceberg or quartz crystal resting on top of an old brick warehouse (Kaispeicher A, built in 1963) near the historical Speicherstadt. The project is the result of a private initiative by the architect and real estate developer Alexander Gérard and his wife Jana Marko, an art historian, who commissioned the original design by the Swiss architecture firm Herzog & de Meuron, who developed and promoted the project (since 2003 in cooperation with the Hamburg-based real estate developer and investor Dieter Becken) for 3.5 years until the City of Hamburg decided to develop the project by itself. It is the key project of the new Hafencity development and the tallest inhabited building in Hamburg, with a final height of 108 metres (354 ft).

The Elbphilharmonie was officially inaugurated with concerts of the NDR Elbphilharmonie Orchestra and a light show on 11 January 2017.

== History ==
On 2 April 2007, the foundation stone was laid in the Kaispeicher A warehouse, in the presence of then First Mayor of Hamburg Ole von Beust, Hochtief Construction AG CEO Henner Mahlstedt, the project coordinator for the City of Hamburg Hartmut Wegener (dismissed in 2008 for mismanagement of the project), Hamburg Minister of Culture Karin von Welck and architect Pierre de Meuron.

In 2007, the construction was scheduled to be finished by 2010 with an estimated cost of €241 million. In November 2008, after the original contract was amended, the costs for the project were estimated at €450 million. In August 2012, the costs were re-estimated to be over €500 million, which should also cover the increased cost for a strengthened roof. Construction work officially ended on 31 October 2016 at a cost of €866 million.

The first public test concert at the Elbphilharmonie was held on 25 November 2016. The official opening concert took place on 11 January 2017 with a performance by the NDR Elbphilharmonie Orchestra under direction of Thomas Hengelbrock. The first musical selection was "Pan" from Benjamin Britten's Six Metamorphoses after Ovid.

The project was criticized because of its cost and schedule overruns; construction was originally estimated to cost about €200 million, while the final cost was €870 million. However, upon completion, Der Spiegel in a comparative analysis suggested that the overrun was relatively "modest" compared to some other international mega-projects.

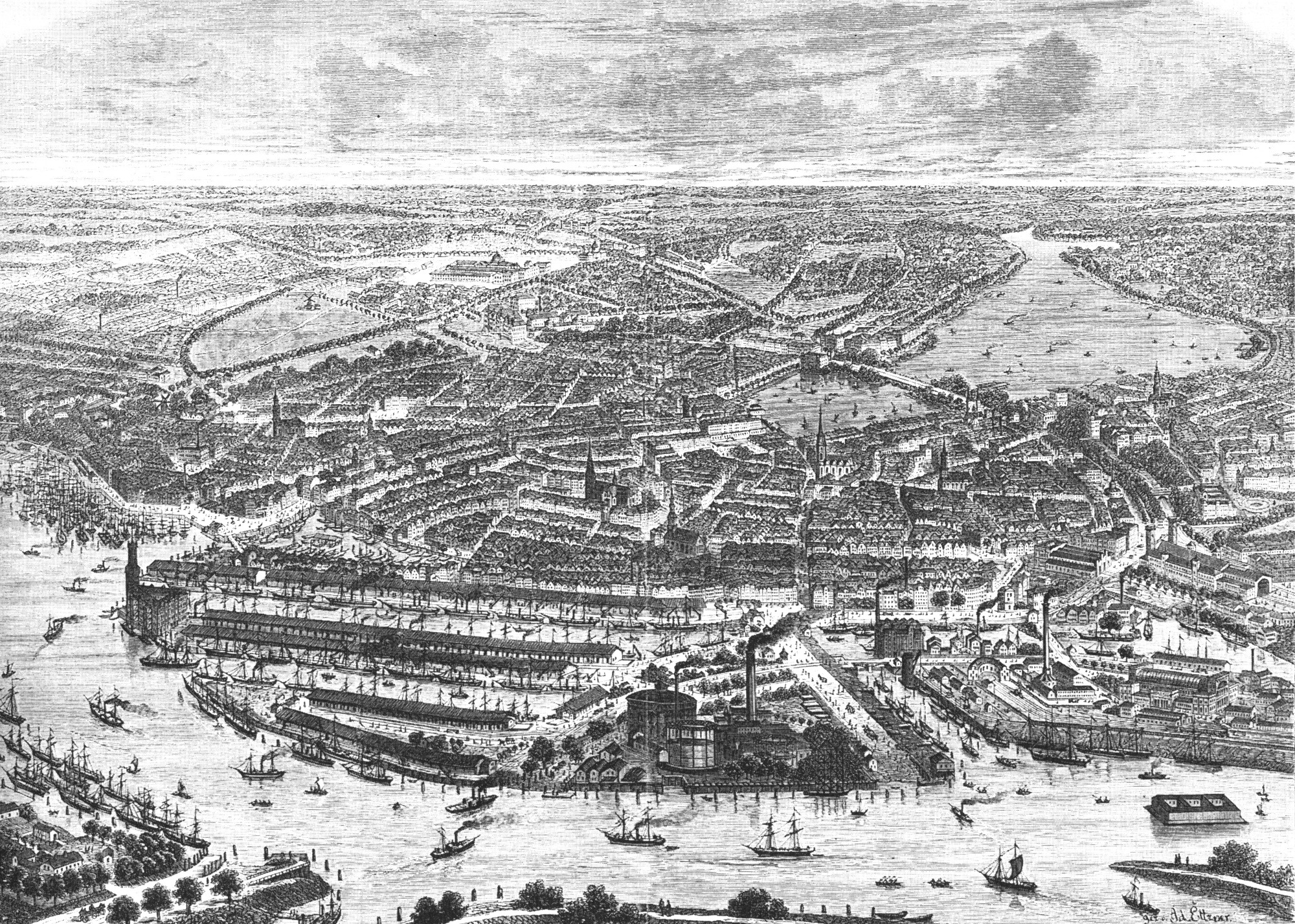
Hamburg aerial view with Kaiserspeicher left-centre, 1882

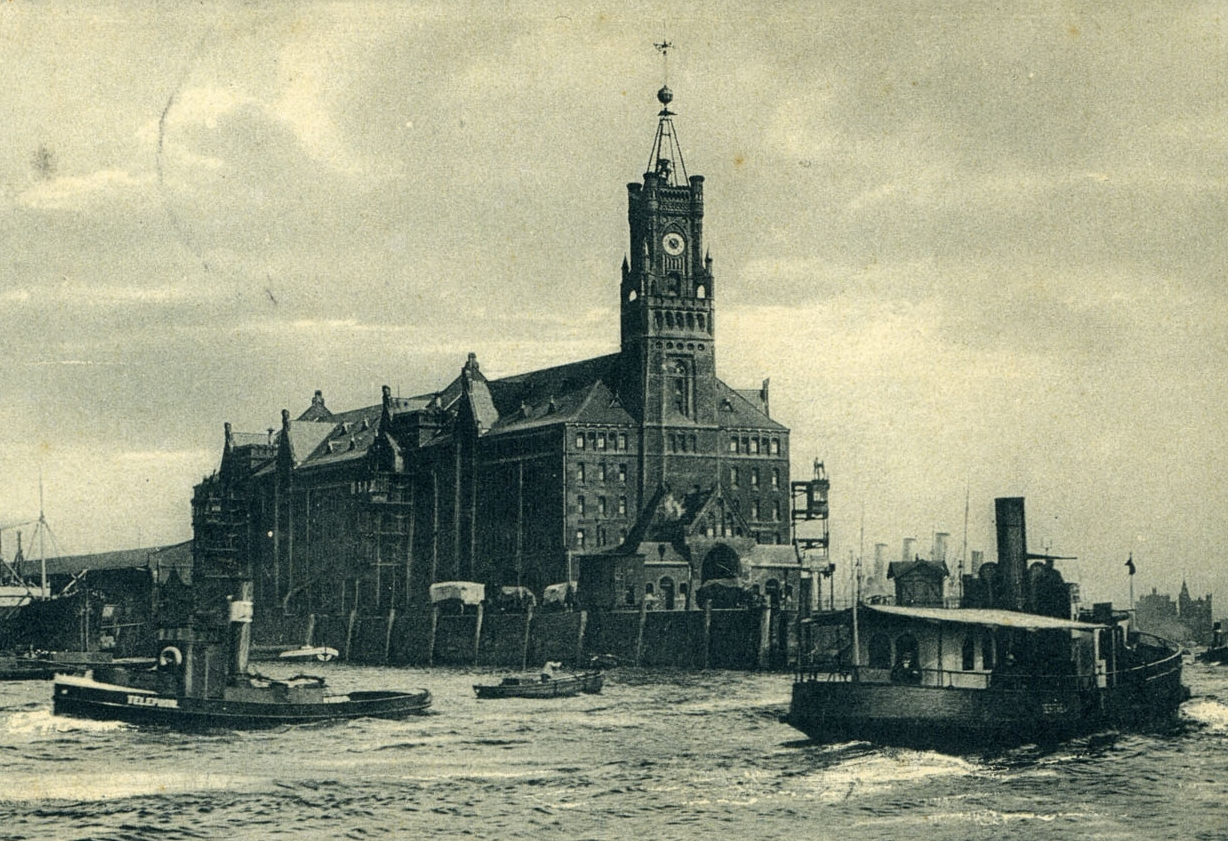
Kaiserspeicher, built 1875, damaged in WW2, demolished 1963

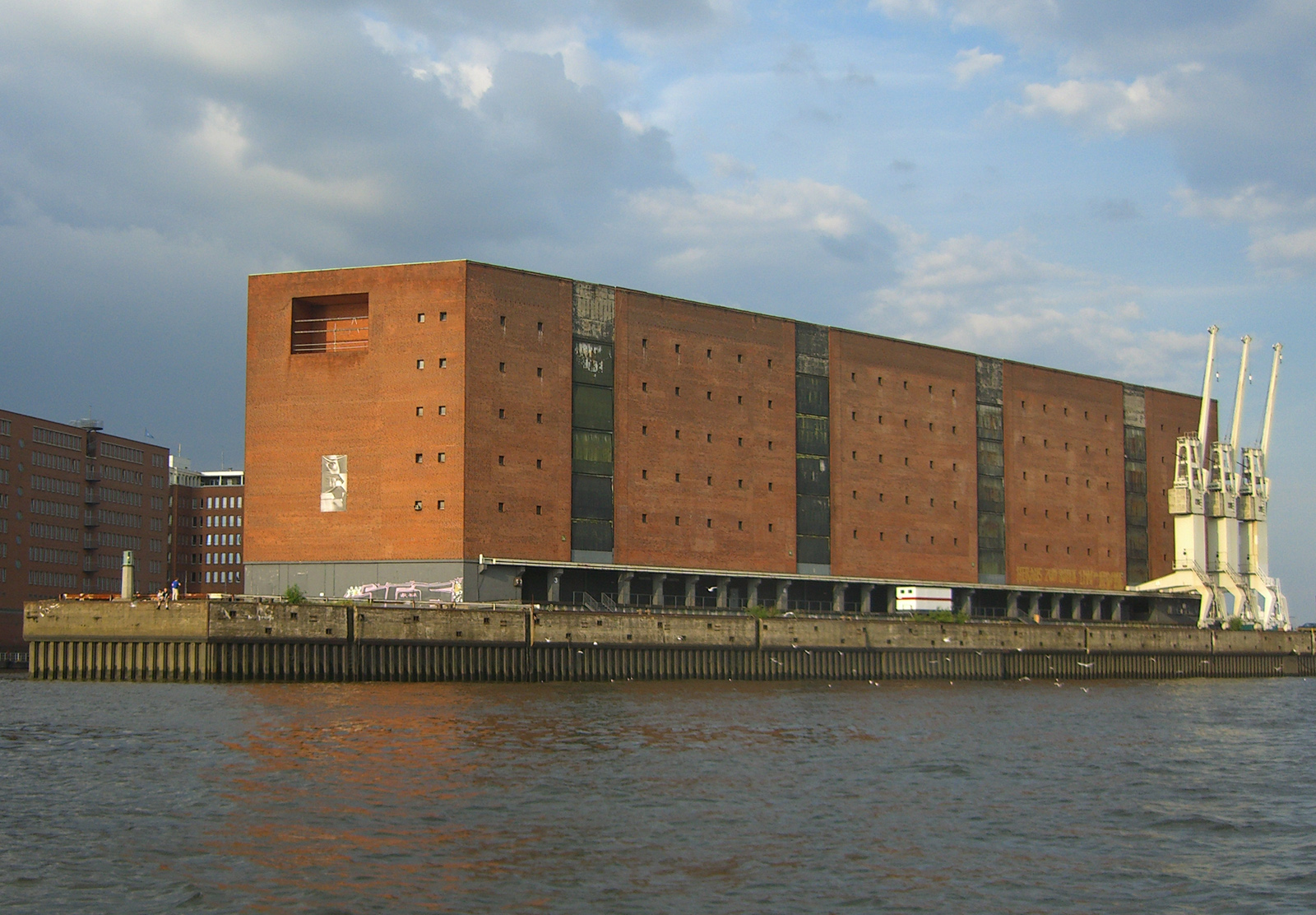
Kaispeicher A by architect Werner Kallmorgen (built 1963) in 2005

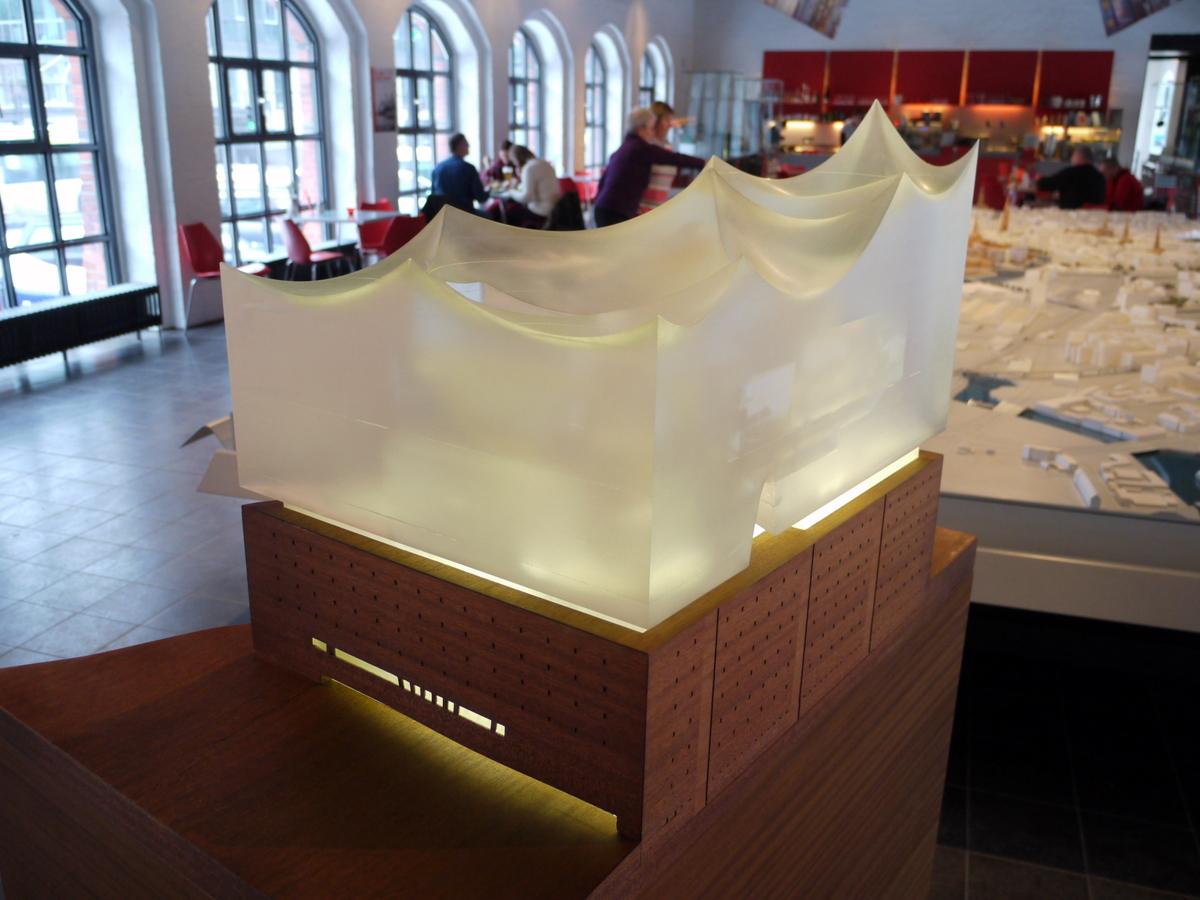
Elbphilharmonie model

The group stage draw for the UEFA Euro 2024 was held here.

== Building ==
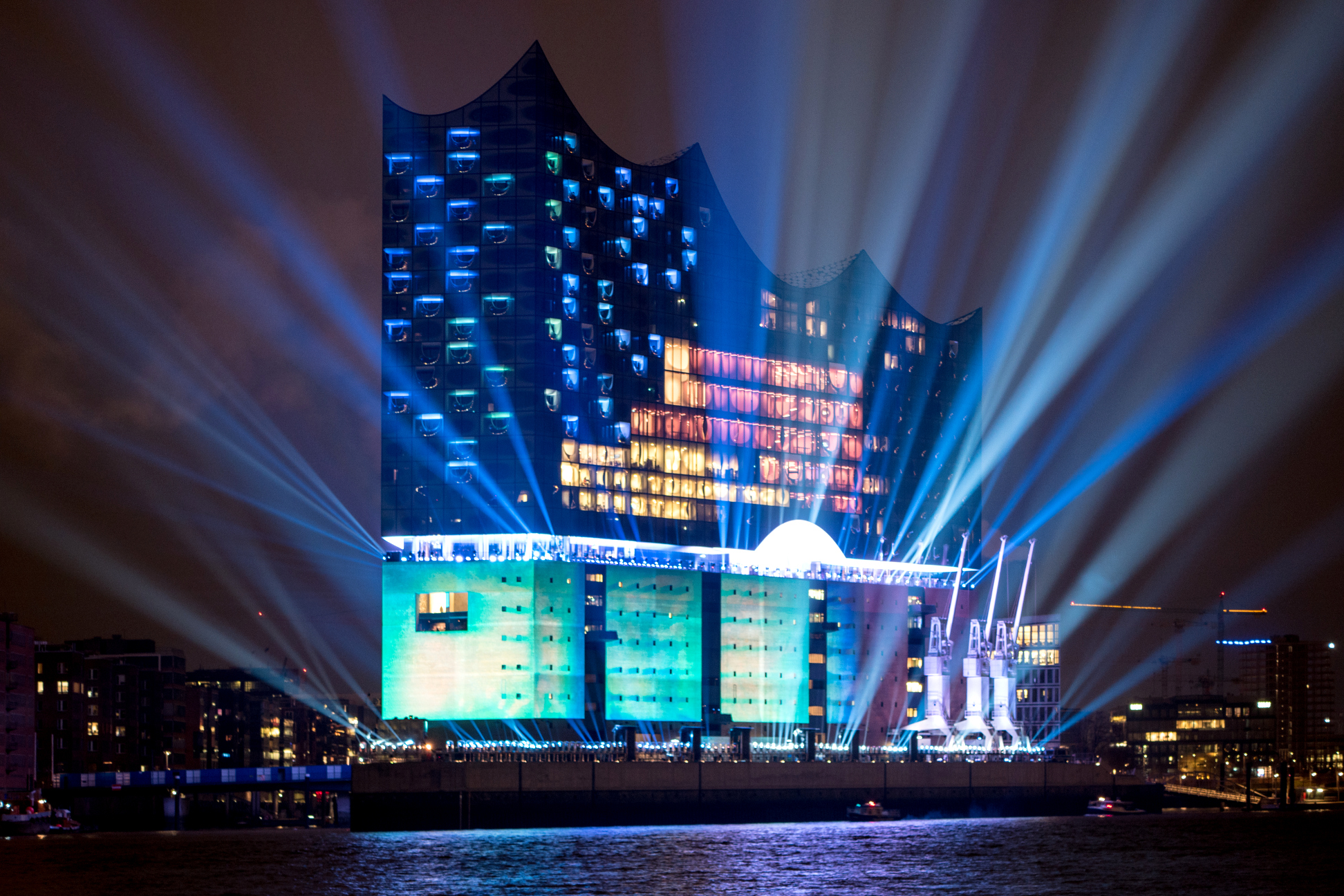
The building illuminated on its opening night on 11 January 2017

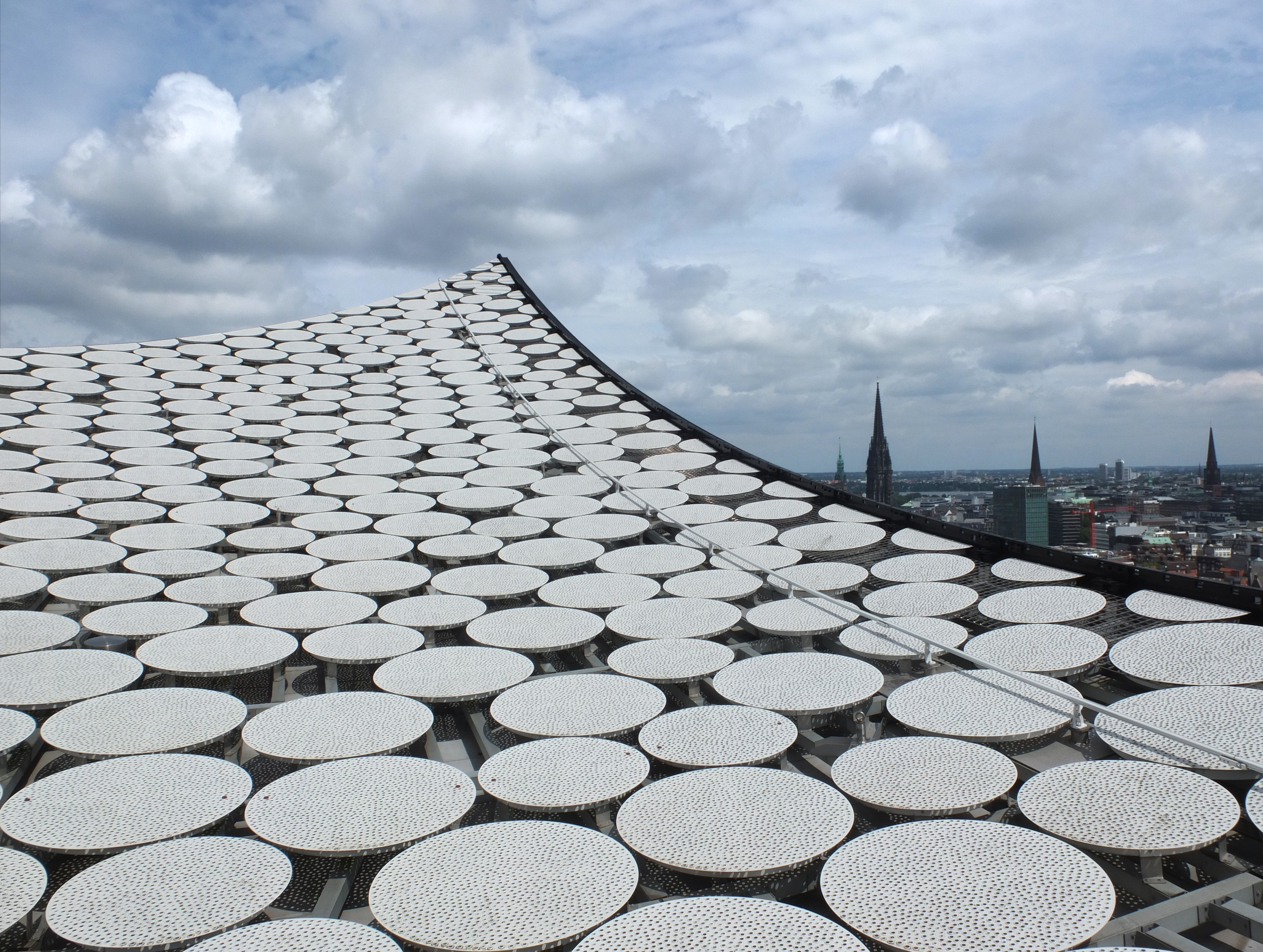
Detail of the roof construction

The building is designed as a cultural and residential complex. The original 1966 brick façade of the Kaispeicher A, formerly a warehouse, was retained at the base of the building. On top of this a footprint-matching superstructure rests on its own foundation exhibiting a glassy exterior and a wavy roof line. About one thousand glass windows are curved. The building has 26 floors with the first eight floors within the brick façade. It reaches its highest point with 108 metres (354 ft) at the western side. The footprint of the building measures 120,000 square metres (1.3×10^{6} ft^{2}). A curved escalator from the main entrance at the east side connects the ground floor with an observation deck, the Plaza, at the 8th floor, the top of the brick section. The Plaza is accessible by the public. It offers a view of Hamburg and the Elbe. From the Plaza the foyer of the concert hall can be reached.

The Elbphilharmonie has three concert venues. The Great Concert Hall can accommodate 2,100 visitors whereby the performers are in the center of the hall surrounded by the audience in the vineyard style arrangement. The acoustics were designed by Yasuhisa Toyota who installed about 10,000 individually microshaped drywall plates to disperse sound waves. The Great Concert Hall contains a pipe organ with 69 registers built by Klais Orgelbau. The Recital Hall is intended for the performance of recitals, chamber music and jazz concerts; it can hold an audience of 550 people. In addition, there is the Kaistudio that allows for 170 visitors and is intended to serve educational activities. The consultant for the scenography of the concert hall was Ducks Scéno.

The easternmost part of the building is rented by Westin which runs the Westin Hamburg Hotel. The hotel opened on 4 November 2016. The hotel offers 250 rooms and 47 condominiums that are serviced. The hotel was designed by the architects of Herzog & de Meuron to provide guests with port of Hamburg panoramas. It was constructed on an existing red-brick building that used to be a warehouse.

== Reception ==
Interior view of the concert hall

Time placed Elbphilharmonie on its "World's 100 Greatest Places of 2018" list, with Kate Rockwood writing that the acoustics "steal the show" and that the hall's panels provide "a richer, better sound", quoting Toyota who said that the more time performers spend in the hall, "the better their ensemble becomes since they can hear themselves and each other more." Forbes contributor Jens F. Laurson noted during an initial performance that "Everything musical (and otherwise) going on up and around the hall is beautifully audible down where I sat and, as per other audience member's accounts, most everywhere else as well", that "[t]he hall is bright, very dry, direct, unforgiving. You can hear everything and immediately, for better and worse". Philip Kennicott of The Washington Post wrote "The acoustics, designed by the renowned Japanese acoustician Yasuhisa Toyota, are a marvel of clarity, precision and cool objectivity".

Some complaints about poor acoustics in the hall have been aired. After the grand opening on 11 January 2017, some musicians as well as conductors called the acoustics in the hall "appalling" and "terrible". In a 2019 performance of Mahler's Das Lied von der Erde, audience members shouted, "can't hear you" at tenor Jonas Kaufmann, who himself later complained, "This hall does not help...".

== Public transport ==
The nearest rail station is Baumwall on Hamburg Metro line 3, about 450 metres (1,480 ft) away. The nearest bus stop is Am Kaiserkai, 150 metres (490 ft) away.

=== Ferry services ===
Elbphilharmonie is the name of a ferry pier, reachable from Hamburg's St. Pauli Piers.

Preceding station	HADAG	Following station
Arningstraße towards St. Pauli (Landungsbrücken)	72	Terminus
St. Pauli (Landungsbrücken) Terminus	Elb-Hüpfer weekend service only	Willkomm-Höft (Wendel) One-way operation
Ferry services
Speicherstadt toward St. Pauli (Landungsbrücken)	Maritime Circle Line	HafenCity (Elbarkaden); One-way operation

== Gallery ==
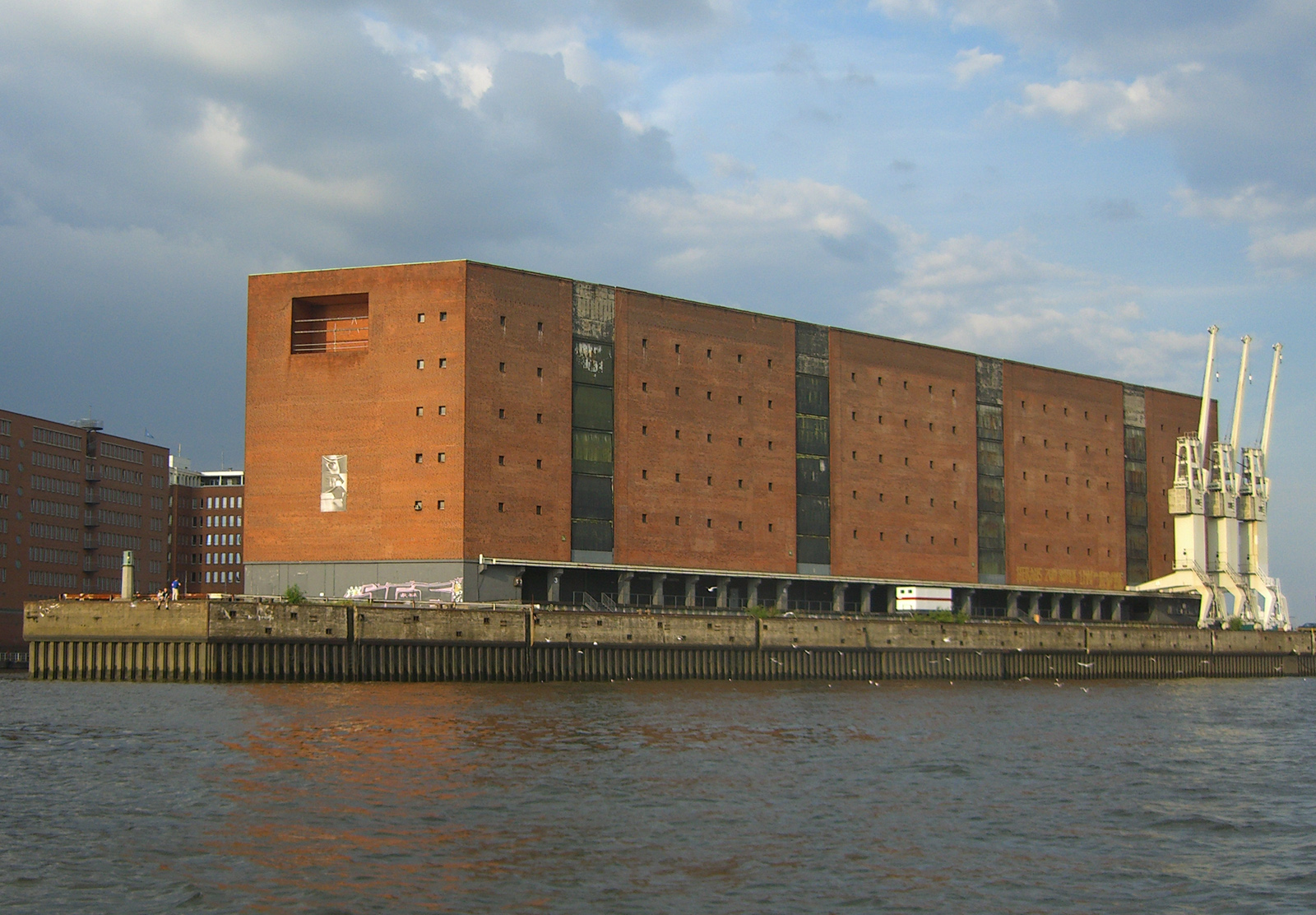
Kaispeicher A in 2005

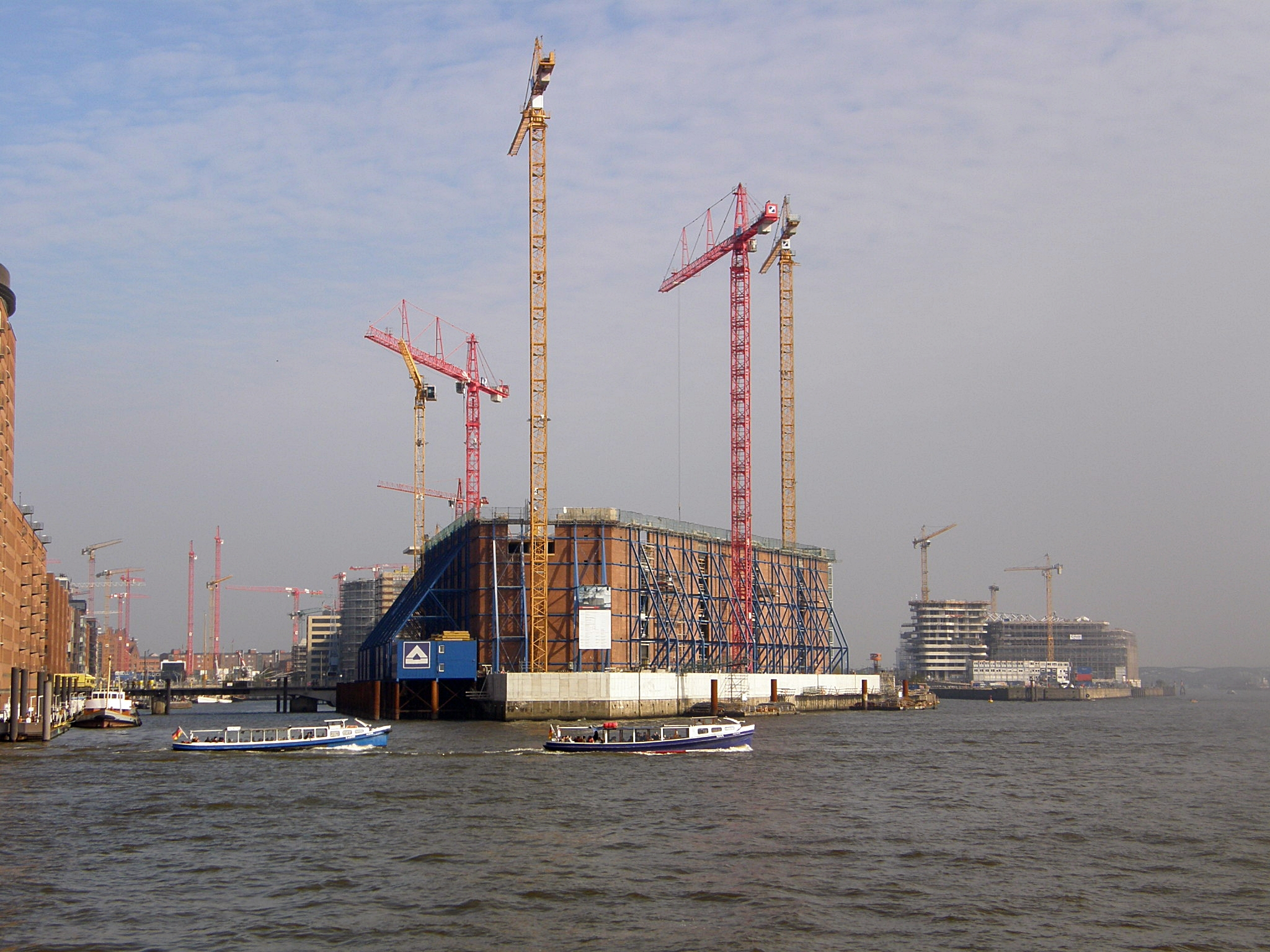
Construction site in 2008

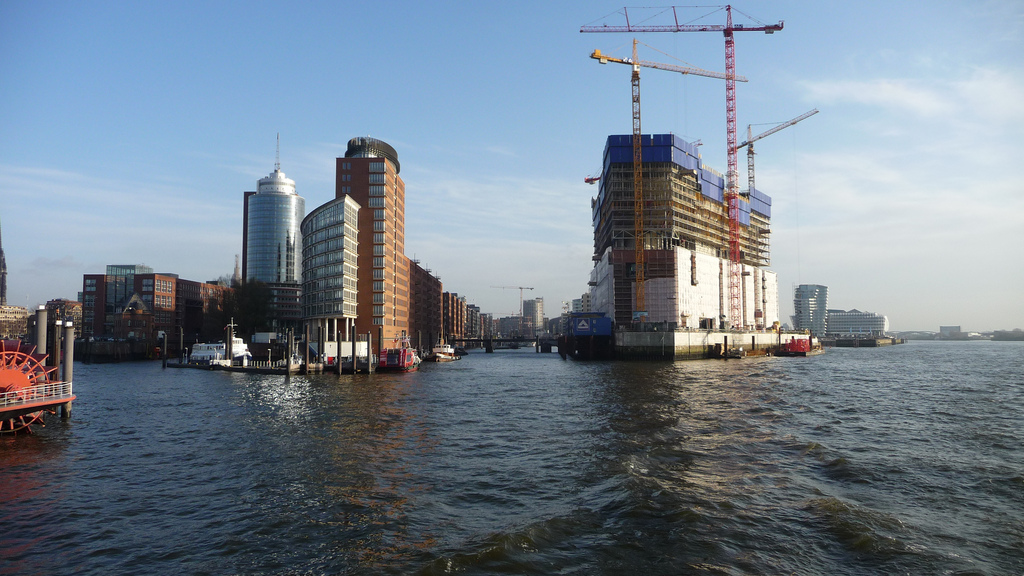
Construction site in December 2009

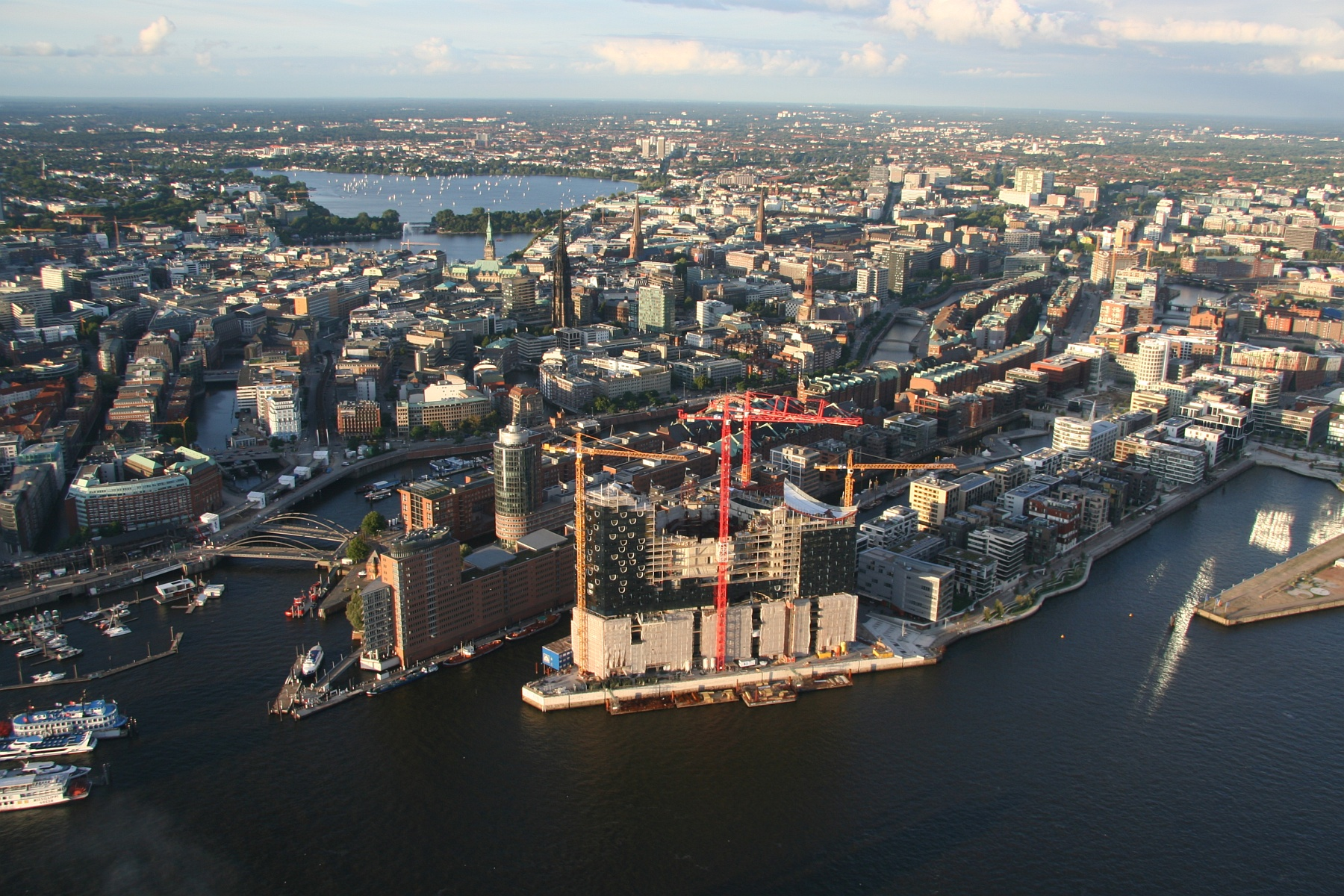
Aerial view, September 2010

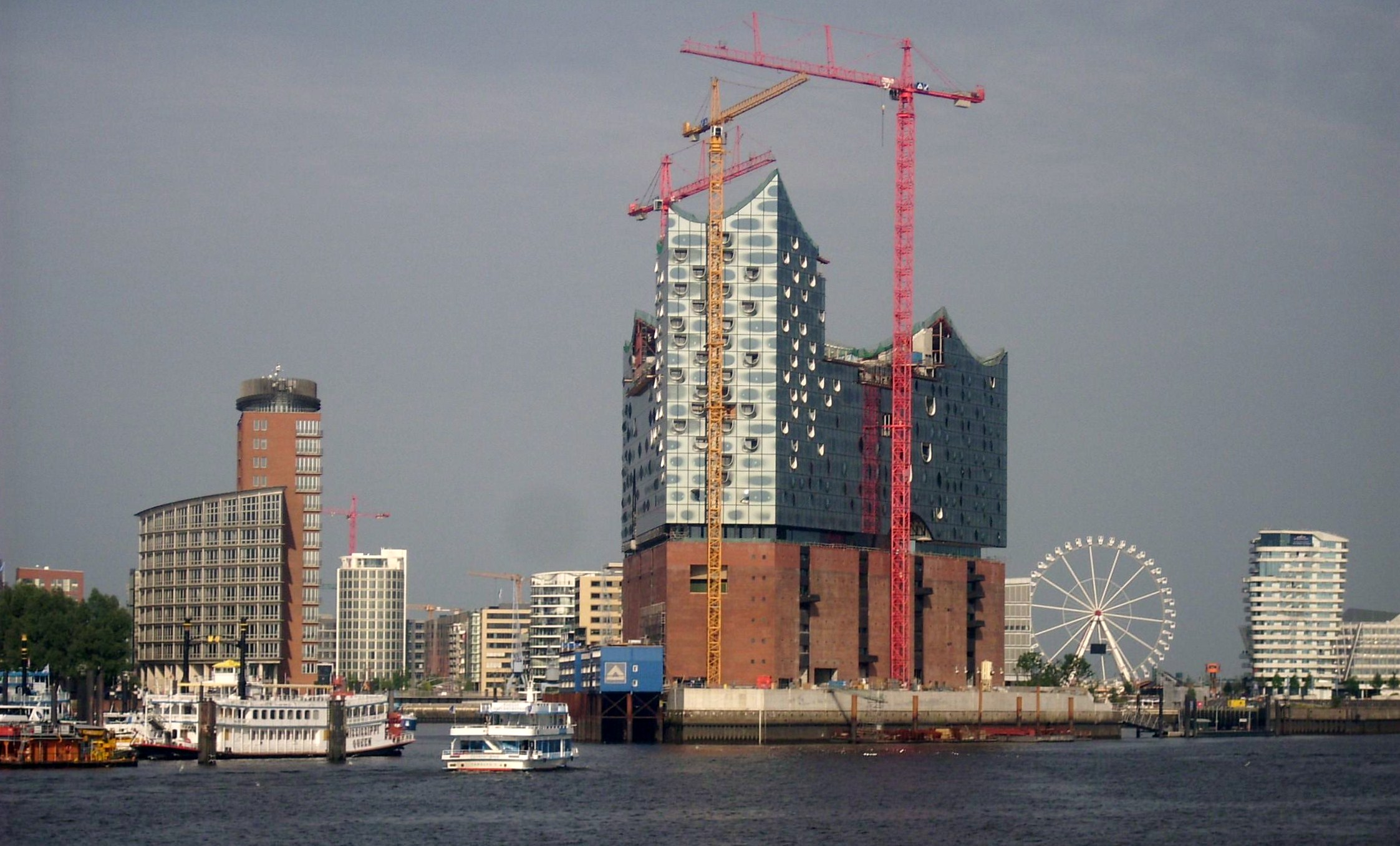
Construction site in 2012

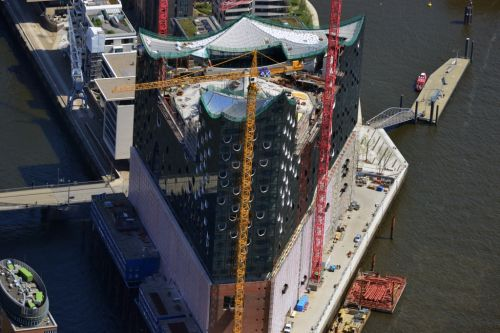
Aerial view with ferry pier in the top right corner, May 2013

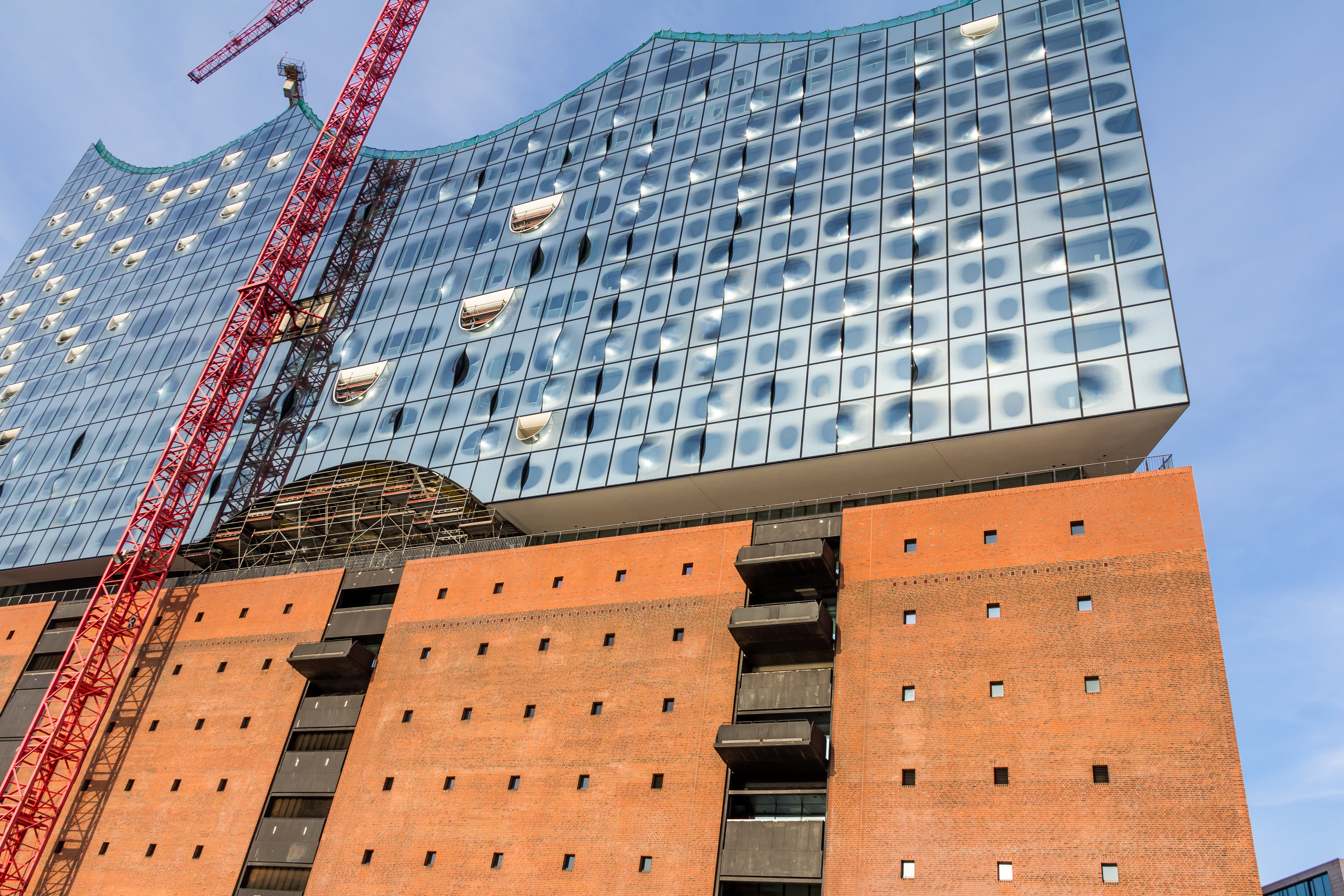
Closeup of the facade, February 2015

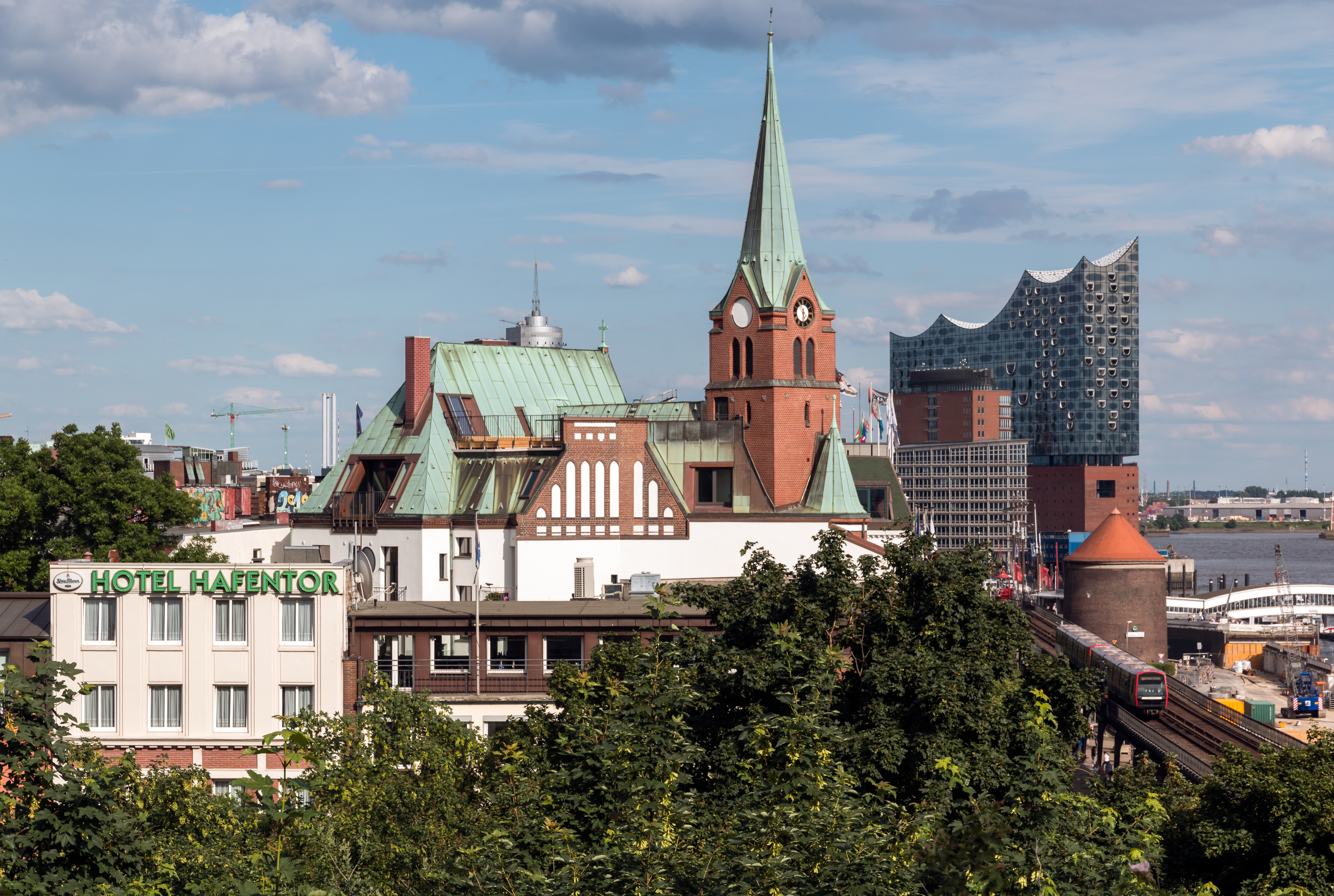
Gustaf Adolfs Church and the Elbphilharmonie, June 2016

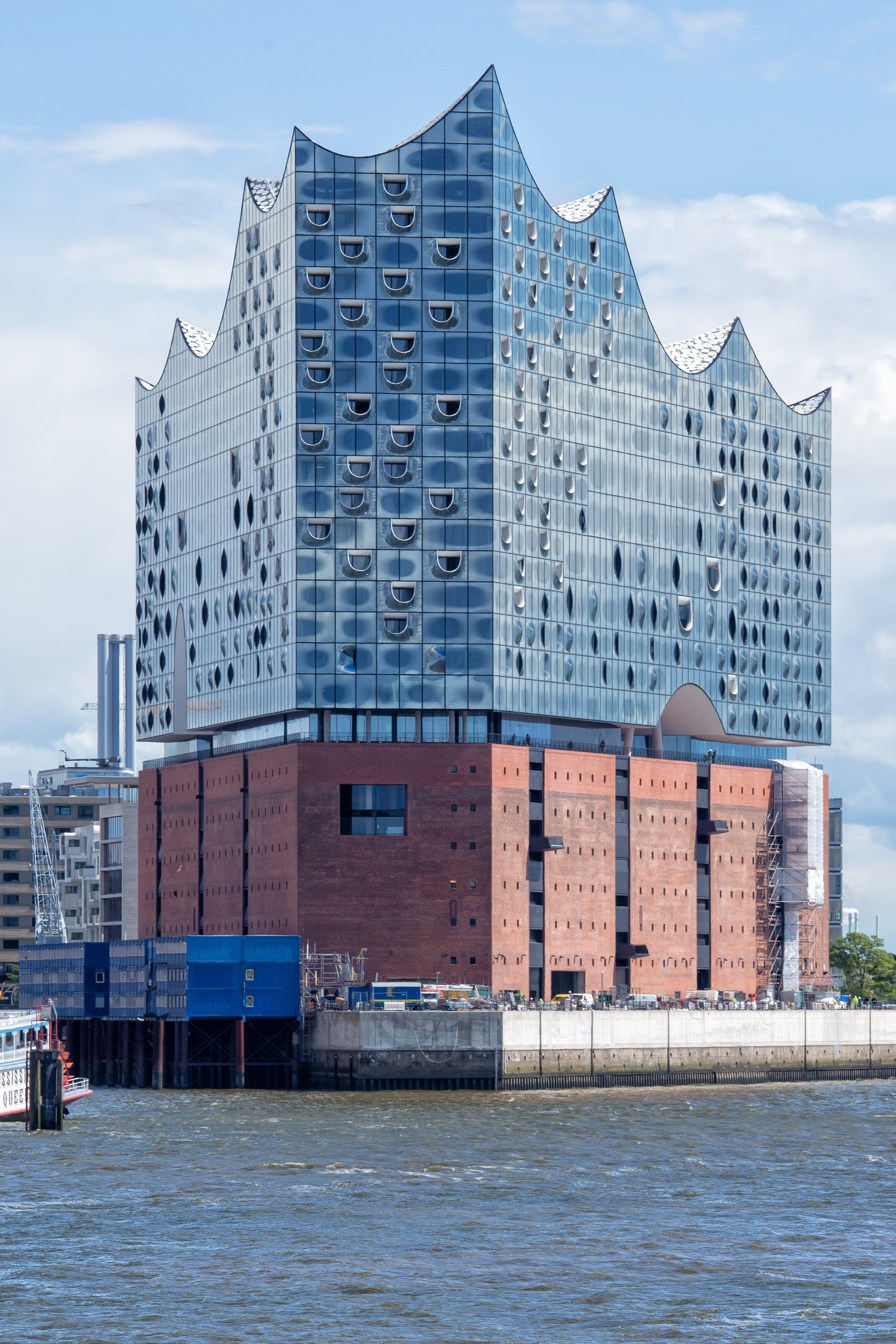
Elbphilharmonie, August 2016
