= BallinStadt =

Museum in Hamburg, Germany

Coordinates: 53°31′14″N 10°1′1″E

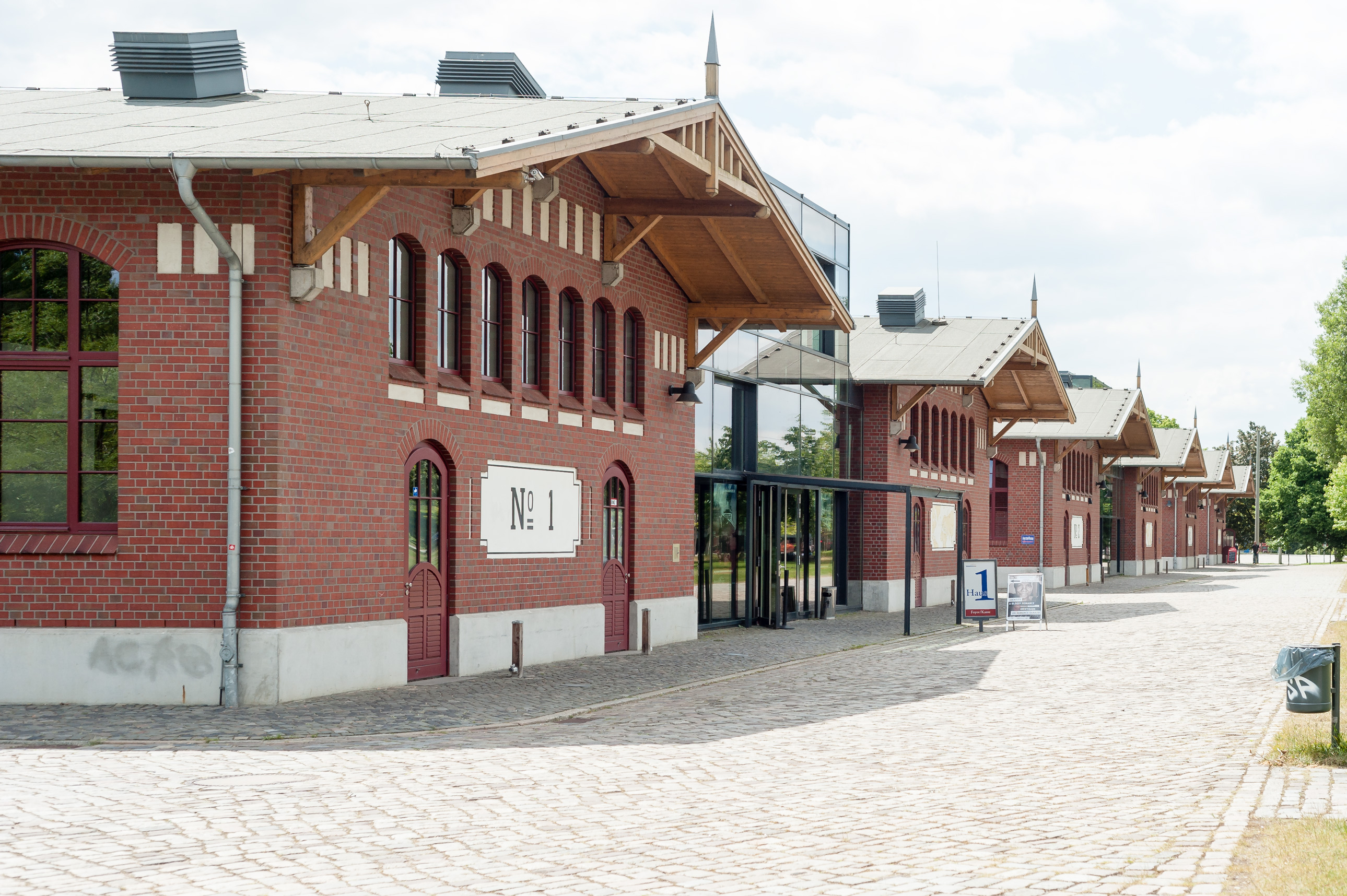
BallinStadt

BallinStadt, Hamburg

BallinStadt (German pronunciation: [baːliːnʃtat]) is the name given to a memorial park and former emigration station in the Port of Hamburg, Germany.

From the 1850s to the early 1930s the ground's emigration halls were last homestead for some five million emigrants from various parts of Europe, waiting for their departure to the Americas. The BallinStadt museum was opened in 2007 and named after Albert Ballin (1857–1918), then director General of the Hamburg America Line. The site is also marketed as the "Emigration Museum" or "Port of Dreams".

Originally built in 1901, the site's Swiss chalet style quarters provided shelter, lodging and/or entertainment for the emigrants. In 1934 the station was closed and demolished by the Nazis, but rebuilt true to original in the early 2000s. Today, the emigration halls (German: Auswandererhallen) accommodate an exhibition related to the emigrants, their living conditions and experiences during their journeys to and from Hamburg.

The city of Hamburg decided to build the BallinStadt emigration world in December 2004, based on an overall concept developed by the Hamburg Maritim Foundation.

== Access ==
BallinStadt is located at Müggenburger Zollhafen on the isle of Veddel, and can be reached by car, public transport from Veddel (BallinStadt) station or via ferry on the Maritime Circle Line from St. Pauli Landungsbrücken.

	Ferry services	
Hafenmuseum toward St. Pauli (Landungsbrücken)	Maritime Circle Line	Ernst-August-Schleuse; One-way operation

== See also ==
- European colonization of the Americas
- List of museums and cultural institutions in Hamburg
