= Willkomm-Höft =

Coordinates: 53°34′5″N 9°42′9″E

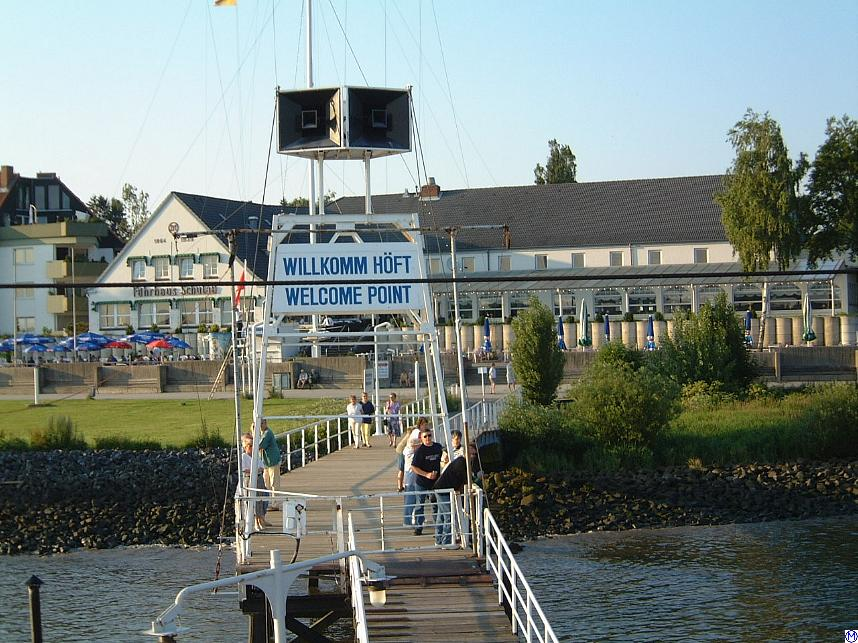
Welcome Point with Schulau Ferry Building

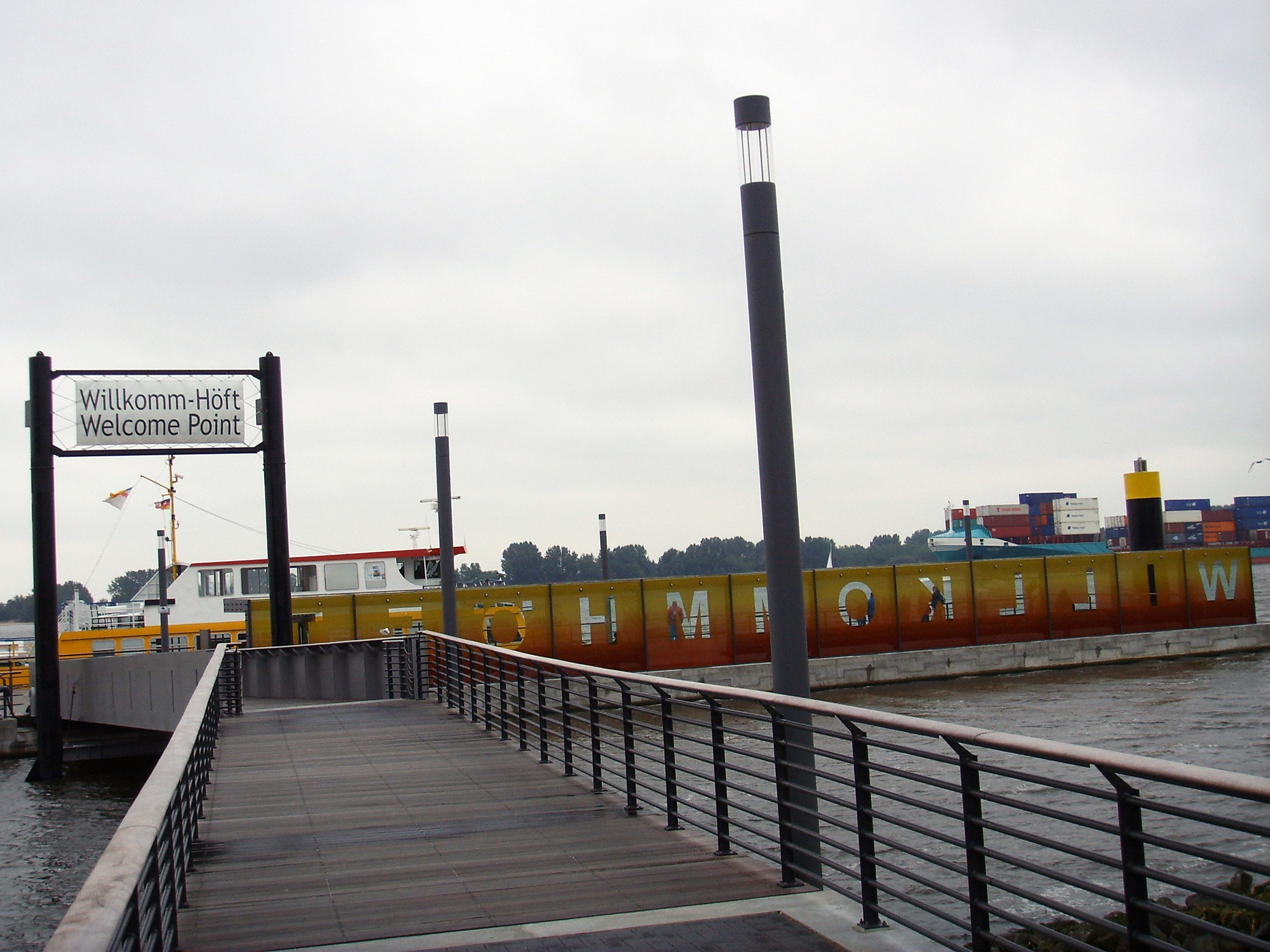
View from ferry building to pier

The Schiffsbegrüßungsanlage Willkomm-Höft (literally, Ship Greeting Station Welcome Point, Höft being Low German for headland or point) is a facility at the Schulauer Fährhaus (Schulau Ferry Building, a restaurant) in Schulau, the southern district of Wedel on the Lower Elbe. It was founded by Otto Friedrich Behnke on 12 June 1952. Currently, it is sponsored by Nautische Kameradschaft HANSEA.

Ships heading upriver for or downriver from the port of Hamburg are welcomed or bid farewell by dipping the Hamburg flag and by hoisting the international flag signal for "bon voyage" (letters U and W). For vessels over 1,000 GT leaving German waters, the national anthem of their country of registry is additionally played between 8:00 AM and sunset or 8:00 PM. Occasionally, the ship will return the greetings by dipping her flag or sounding her whistle.

For the welcomes and farewells, there are recordings of 152 different national anthems of maritime nations, or rather of those that keep a register of shipping, and welcoming and farewell messages in the local language. These are available on compact cassette (red lettering for welcome, black lettering for farewell) and computer. Both systems can be used interchangeably.

The ship welcoming station is notified on arriving and departing vessels by the Hamburg nautical registration office once an inbound ship has passed Stadersand or an outbound ship, Hamburg Finkenwerder. Visitors are briefed on each ship by loudspeaker. Information includes name, nationality, date of construction, builder, operator, length, beam, and draught. Plus, if applicable and known, container capacity and trivia. These data are stored in a constantly updated, handwritten card index on about 17,000 ships.

The ceremony of ship welcoming and farewell is performed by five so-called "welcoming captains." As of late 2021 the captains are Eckart Bolte, Wolfgang Adler, Hartmut Hoffmann, Uwe Mohr and Wolfgang Eder.

== Ferry services ==
Willkomm-Höft can be reached by ferry from Hamburg's St. Pauli Piers.

Preceding station	HADAG	Following station
Elbphilharmonie towards St. Pauli (Landungsbrücken)	Elb-Hüpfer weekends only	Blankenese One-way operation
Ferry services
Lühe; Terminus	LSF Lühe-Schulau Ferry weekday service only	Terminus
Cuxhaven toward Heligoland	FRS Helgoline season service only	St. Pauli (Landungsbrücken); Terminus
