= Fischmarkt Hamburg-Altona =

German logistics company

- Location: Hamburg, Germany
- Opening date: 1989
- Owner: Hamburger Hafen und Logistik Aktiengesellschaft (HHLA)
- Goods sold: Fish
- Number of tenants: 57
- Total retail floor area: 62,800 m2

The Fischmarkt Hamburg-Altona GmbH (FMH) develops and administrates the area of the fishing port in the Altona district of Hamburg, Germany. The FMH is a complete subsidiary of the Hamburger Hafen und Logistik Aktiengesellschaft (HHLA) since 1989. Approximately 36,000 tons of fresh fish are transferred yearly on the grounds of the fish market. The market includes 57 fishing and gastronomical businesses with 750 employees and annual sales of 280 million Euros altogether. About 14 percent of Germany's fresh fish supply is being processed in Hamburg.

== History ==
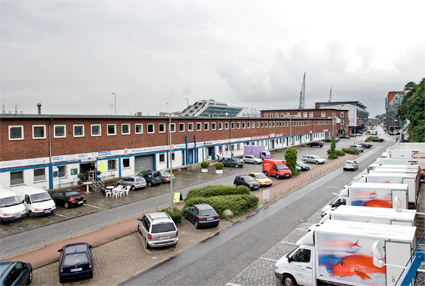
Fischmart buildings in Altona

As early as the 19th century there were attempts to merge the two already existing fish-markets of Hamburg and Altona into one common fishmarket. This merging was to take place mainly due to decades of ongoing rivalry between those two fishmarkets. The two fishmarkets were in fact only separated by official administrative borders: Altona's salesroom for fish, which has been operating since 1896, was only a few hundred metres away from Hamburg's salesroom, which remained on this site until 1971. After many negotiations, the two cities came to an arrangement about the modalities of a merger. In July 1934, the "Fischmarkt Hamburg Altona G.m.b.H." took up business as a subsidiary manufacturing company.

On the political side of things, the process was finally completed as the Greater Hamburg Act came into force on 1 April 1937 after several years of discussion. Former Prussian Altona was united with Wandsbek and Harburg-Wilhelmsburg with Hamburg, while Hamburg in return had to cede the city of Geesthacht, some smaller municipalities and its fishing port of Cuxhaven to Prussia. Through this process, the company was renamed to Fish Market Hamburg-Altona GmbH (FMH) in March 1938.

The shared Fischmarkt Hamburg-Altona alongside the big Weser markets became the most important fishing harbor in Germany. It grew to be the leading market for gourmet fish, the biggest trans-shipment center for herring and temporarily the dominating location of the German fish industry. Extensive changes in the international fish and fishing industry in the following years and decades were the reason that the main business of the FMH gradually shifted. The FMH succeeded in expanding the Fischmarkt Altona into the only specialized location for premium seafood products in Germany. It currently covers about a third of the consumption of fresh fish in the metropolitan area of Hamburg. Simultaneously, the development and marketing of commercial space for the fish industry businesses took on greater significance. In the 1980s, the FMH transitioned into a modern service industry.

In order to prepare the challenges of an intensified intra-European competition and possible market slumps due to a globalized economy, the company repositioned itself. The reason for this was to concentrate the future fish economy without restrictions at the fish market and to secure the workplaces at the FMH as well as the industry at the fishing port. With this in mind the FMH was sold to the "Hamburger Hafen und Logistik Aktiengesellschaft" (HHLA) in December 1989. The transformation to a modern and economically focused company was finally finished.

== FMH today ==
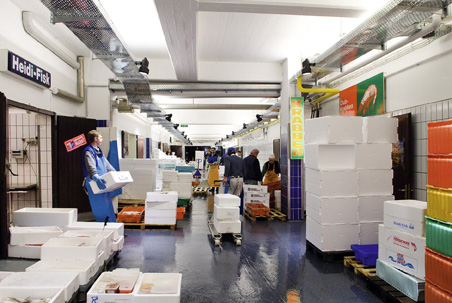
Merchants in the new market hall No. 1

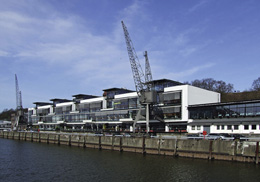
Elbkaihaus building with new industrial and office rooms

On about 62.800 square meters, FMH develops areas designed for offices and commerce that are for the greater part tailored specifically to the needs of local fishing and harbor businesses. At the same time it offers services in the fields of deep-frozen goods, fish-trading and gastronomy. All in all, there are about 130 tenants from different trades in the area today.

With the city council supporting this development, the fish market has for quite a while now become a magnet for tourists and excursionists from Hamburg alike. To this end, the citizenry decided to build a new terminal for cruise liners in October 2007. In order to enable establishing this additional usage, as well as an organized city development, it was decided in 2006 to release the area from the laws regulating harbor development. The basic idea for future development is opening the area to a broader public and the advancement of the specific milieu of industrial fishing into an architectural attraction. In this regard, FMH guarantees that the center of Hamburg's fishing industry will still be located at the Fischereihafen in the future. In addition to its economic and structural policy importance for Hamburg, the fishing industry gives its charm to the area, its traditional connection and unique milieu, to which not only citizens of Hamburg feel connected, but which has special appeal to cruisers and other tourists.

=== From a closed industrial estate to an open quarter ===
Due to the rediscovery of the northern banks of the river Elbe, the northern edge of the port slowly integrated itself into the famous and frequented line of the port between Neumühlen and HafenCity since the beginning of the 80s. In the meantime, several of the foundation buildings of the fishing port had been included into the planning. After being renovated und newly used by the FMH (the company "Fish Market Hamburg-Altona") as the first old storehouse in the area from 1980 to 1982, the storehouse D was registered in the list of historical monuments of the city in July 1992. In 1993/4, the residential home Augustinum was finished and ready to move into in the former Union refrigerated storage building. The FMH turned the former cold store III into the "Elbkaihaus" (used as office building) between 1998 and 1999. Afterwards, the machine building, which lies next to the former hall III in the West, was renovated in the summer of 2003. The "Dockland" office buildings were finally constructed at the western end of the wharf for equipment in 2005. All those projects result from tenders and plans from the second half of the 1980s. Recent plans want to demolish both cold stores IV and V to complete the line between the port of Neumühlen and HafenCity. An architectural competition for the future development was brought to life by the FMH. The results of this competition were presented in July 2010. The FMH, who wants to invest about €75,000,000 in this project, planned the start of construction for 2013. Although the FMH supports the change from a closed, fishery orientated industrial park to a more open area, it wants to guarantee for the persistence of the fisheries management of Hamburg at this point. The two cold stores VI and V will be demolished but a new building with a glassy fish manufactory is said to be constructed right on the opposing hillside.

The market was closed for the first time in its 300 year history in March 2020 due to the COVID-19 pandemic.
