= Cap San Diego =

Cargo ship

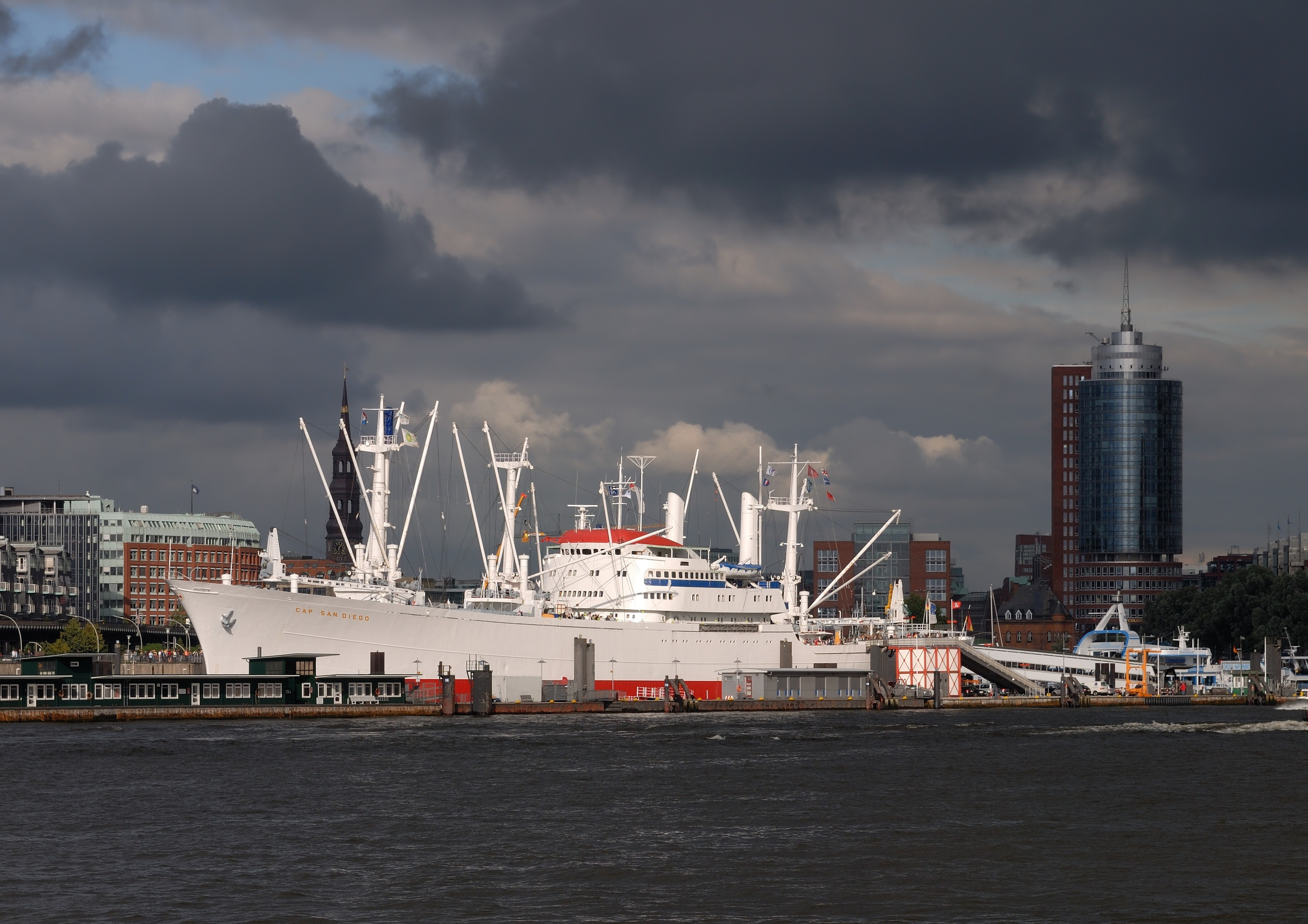
- Cap San Diego at St. Pauli Landungsbrücken, Hamburg (2011)

History

Germany
- Name: Cap San Diego
- Namesake: San Diego, California
- Owner: Hamburg Süd
- Route: Germany-South America
- Builder: Deutsche Werft
- Launched: 15 December 1961
- Maiden voyage: 29 March 1962
- Home port: Hamburg
- Identification: IMO number: 5060794
- Nickname(s): "White Swan of the South Atlantic"

Spain
- Name: Sangria
- Owner: Ybarra
- Acquired: 1981
- Identification: IMO number: 5060794
- Notes: Sold for scrap; city of Hamburg stepped in and purchased her for preservation.

Germany
- Name: Cap San Diego
- Owner: Free and Hanseatic City of Hamburg
- Acquired: 1986
- Identification: IMO number: 5060794
- Fate: Turned over to Hamburger Admiralität foundation for preservation.

Germany
- Owner: Hamburger Admiralität
- Operator: Cap San Diego Betriebsgesellschaft mbH
- Acquired: 1987
- Identification: IMO number: 5060794; MMSI number: 211855000; Callsign: DNAI
- Status: Museum Ship

General characteristics
- Type: Freighter
- Tonnage: 9,998 GRT; 5,728 NRT; 10,000 DWT
- Displacement: 17,470 tons fully loaded
- Length: 159.40 m (523 ft 0 in)
- Beam: 21.47 m (70 ft 5 in)
- Installed power: 11,600 hp (8,700 kW)
- Propulsion: MAN two-stroke 9 cylinder diesel engine
- Speed: 20.3 knots (37.6 km/h; 23.4 mph)
- Capacity: 12 first class only
- Crew: 38

Cap San Diego
- Location of Cap San Diego Cap San Diego (Germany)
- Coordinates: 53°32′35″N 9°58′35″E

MS Cap San Diego is a general cargo ship, situated as a museum ship in Hamburg, Germany. Notable for her elegant silhouette, she was the last of a series of six ships known as "the White Swans of the South Atlantic", and marked the apex of German-built general cargo ships before the advent of the container ship and the decline of Germany's heavy industry.

== History ==
Cap San Diego was built and launched by Deutsche Werft in 1961 for Hamburg Süd as the last of a series of six ships. TThe 159-metre (521 ft 8 in), 10,000 DWT ship ran a regular schedule between Germany and South America, completing 120 round trips until 1981. After being sold and running under different names and under Spanish flag and also flags of convenience as a tramp trader, the run-down ship was scheduled for scrapping in 1986 when she was bought by the city of Hamburg.

== Museum ship ==
The ship was restored mainly by the labour of enthusiasts and laid-off dock workers, and is kept operational to date. Most of the time, Cap San Diego is moored at the port of Hamburg where visitors can access virtually all areas of the ship from the bridge to the engine. One of the cargo holds hosts temporary exhibitions. Passenger cabins can be booked for overnight stays. Several times a year, the ship leaves the harbour on her own power for trips mostly on the river Elbe or to Cuxhaven. In 2001, the ship was awarded the Maritime Heritage Award by the World Ship Trust, and in 2003 she was declared a protected item of cultural heritage under Hamburg law.

The ship participates in Hamburg's Long Night of Museums.

== Sister ships ==
Cap San Diego had five sister ships:

- Cap San Nicolas, scrapped in 1982
- Cap San Marco, scrapped in 1985
- Cap San Lorenzo, scrapped in 1982
- Cap San Augustin, scrapped in 1984
- Cap San Antonio, scrapped in 1986

== Gallery ==
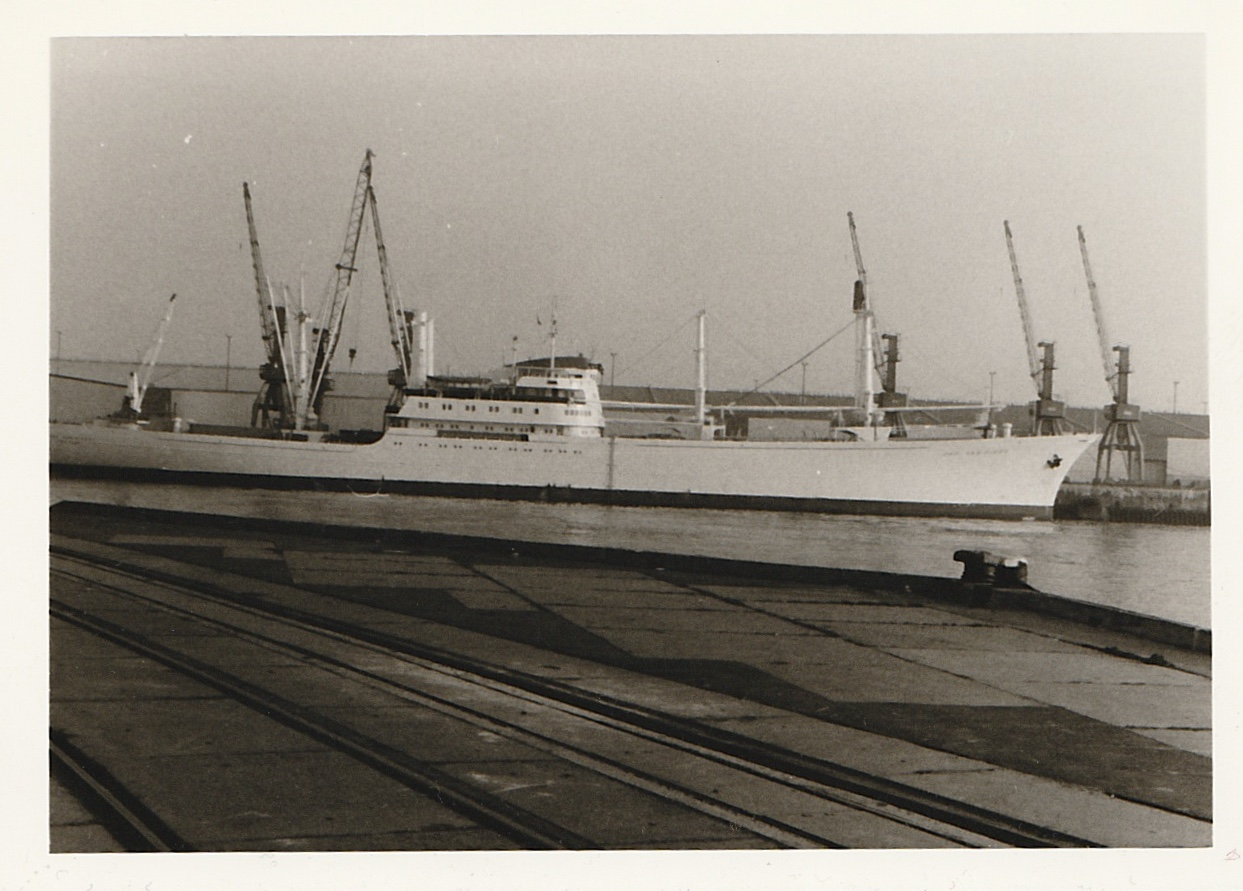
Cap San Diego in September 1975

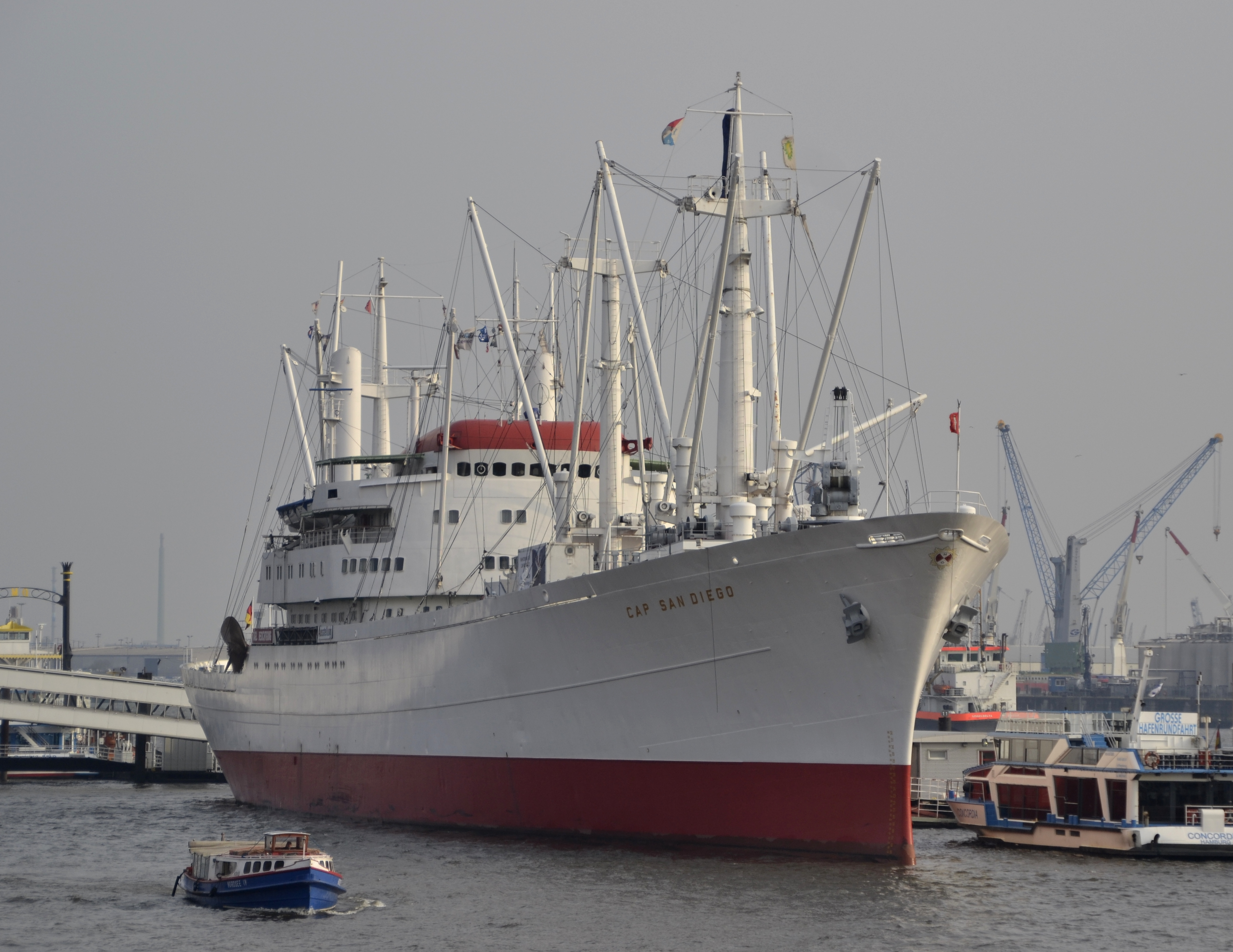
Cap San Diego at Port of Hamburg, 2014

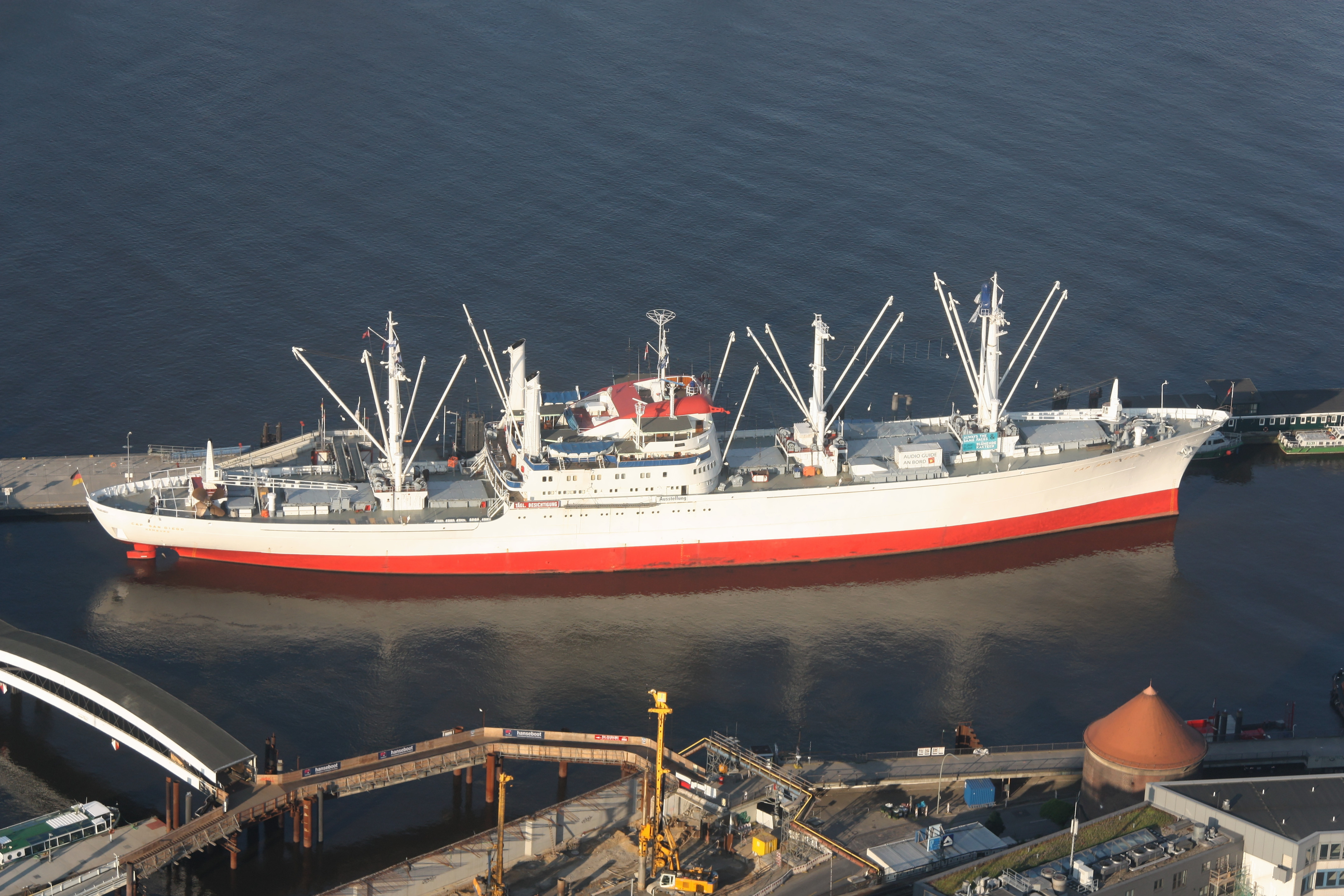
Aerial view of the museum ship Cap San Diego in Hamburg

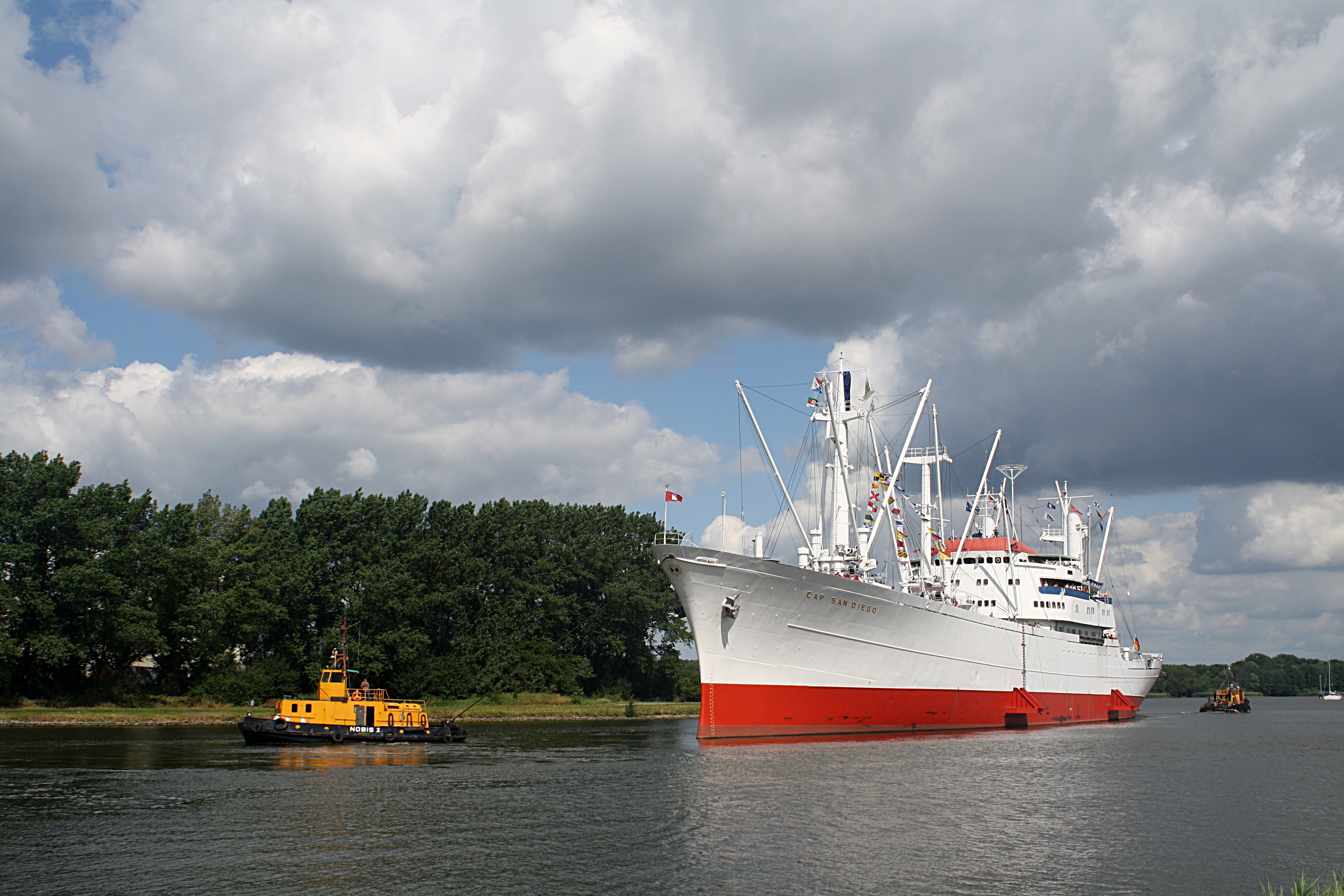
Cap San Diego on Kiel Canal, 18 July 2010

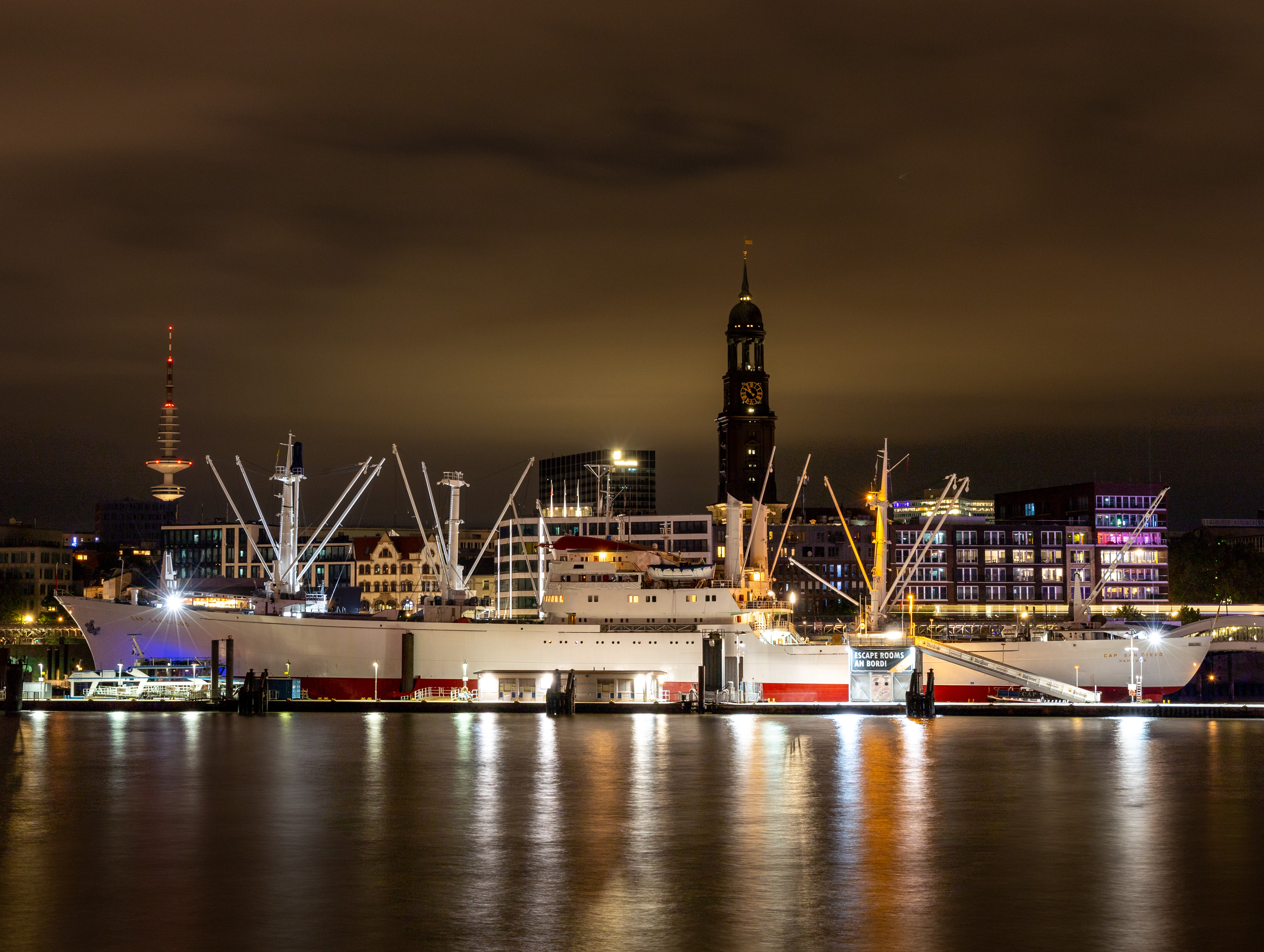
Cap San Diego (2021)

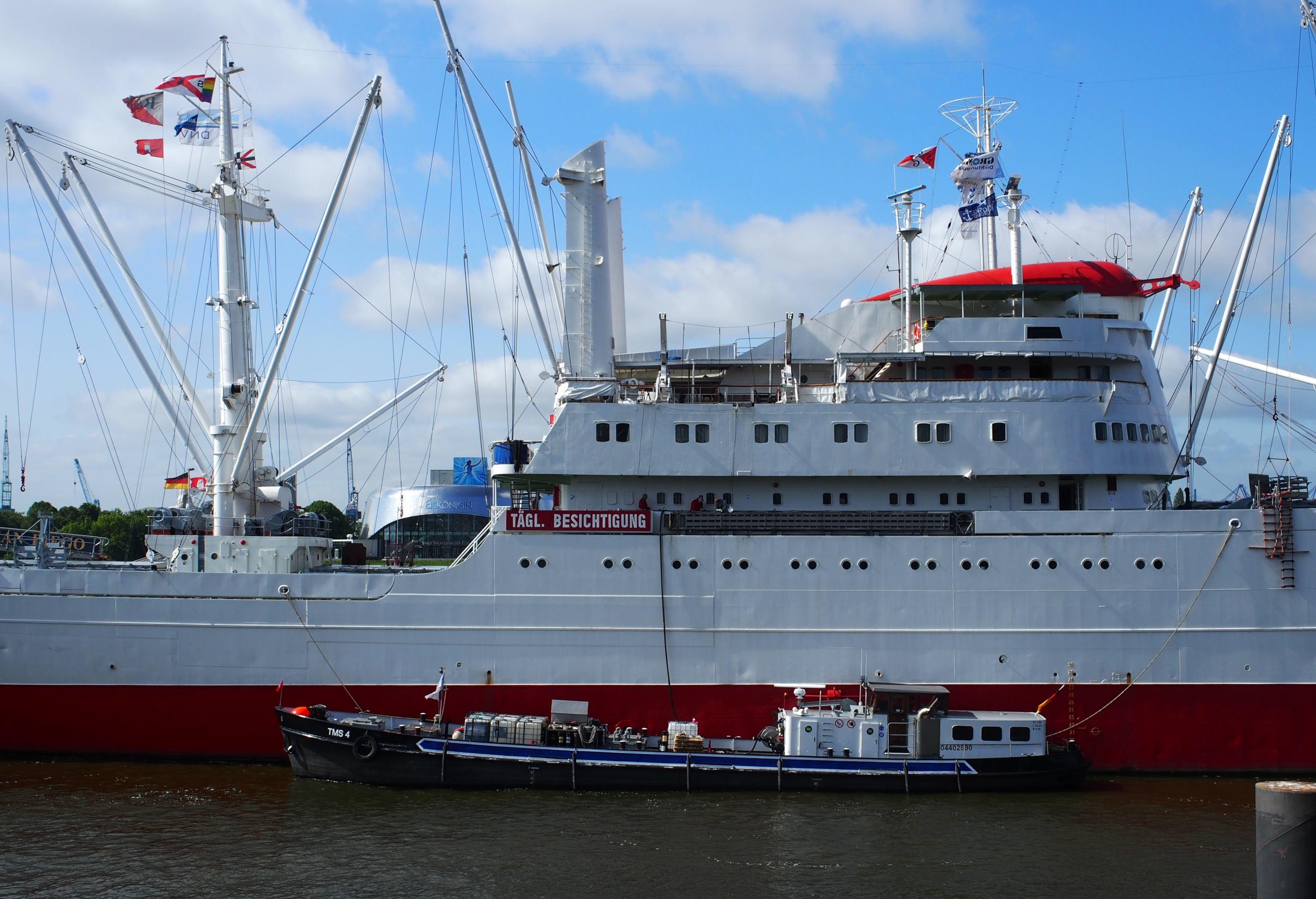
superstructure
