= Alabama International Trade Center =

American government agency

Agency overview
- Formed: 1979
- Headquarters: Tuscaloosa, AL
- Parent agency: U.S. Small Business Administration
- Website: AITC Homepage

The Alabama International Trade Center was created in 1979 as one of the first international Small Busicness Development Centers (SBDCs). Since its inception, the AITC has provided export trade research, education, finance, and training throughout Alabama.

== History & Personnel ==
Dr. William R. Bennett, Emeritus Professor of Marketing and International Business at the University of Alabama, founded the Trade Center in 1979. AITC was one of the first university-based small business development centers in the country that focused specifically on international trade. Following Dr. Bennett's retirement in 1983, Ms. Nisa Miranda, who had helped Bennett establish the Center while completing her MBA, was promoted to Director. Miranda would oversee the Center's growth and development for the next 21 years, helping the Center become designated as SBA's State Model of Excellence in International Trade. (Miranda has since moved on to become Director of the University of Alabama's Center for Economic Development.

In 2004, Mr. Brian Davis, who had served as the Trade Center's Associate Director since 1985, took over as Director. Davis is the former president of the Alabama World Trade Association (AWTA) and NASBITE International. In addition to serving on the University's Advisory Board for International Business, Davis is also active in the Alabama-India Business Partnership.

AITC currently employs several consultants:

- Michael J. Brooks, Assistant Director - Research & Training
- Carolyn Turner, International Trade Specialist
- Elaine Phillips, International Trade Specialist
- Deborah van der Toorn, Export Trade Consultant
- Erin Coleman, Project Accountant
- Karla Jordan, Administrative Assistant

In addition to the professional staff, AITC employs up to 20 Research Fellows as part of its research staff. The Research Fellows are hired on a competitive basis, and consist of graduate and undergraduate students with expertise in market research, business strategy, foreign relations, political science, and foreign languages. Mr. Brooks was in charge of hiring and training the research staff between 1998 and 2010. He also teaches an import-export class at the Culverhouse College of Business. Mrs. Turner now manages the research staff, and coordinates workshops and webinars throughout the state.

The Trade Center is part of the Alabama Small Business Development Center Network, a statewide network of 10 management and technical assistance centers.

The Small Business Administration (SBA) is a United States government agency that provides support to small businesses. The SBA was created by way of the Small Business Act of July 30, 1953.

== Export Alabama Trade Alliance ==
The Alabama International Trade Center is a founding member of the Export Alabama Trade Alliance. Export Alabama is a group of government agencies, business and professional associations, and economic development entities in Alabama that share the fundamental goal of helping Alabama companies to grow their business internationally. The list of Export Alabama partners includes:

- Alabama Development Office
- Alabama International Trade Center
- Alabama State Port Authority
- Alabama World Trade Association (AWTA)
- Birmingham Regional Chamber of Commerce
- Madison County Commission, International Trade Development Center
- Mobile Area Chamber of Commerce
- North Alabama International Trade Association
- Port of Huntsville
- US Chamber of Commerce
- US Department of Commerce, Birmingham & Tallahassee Offices

As part of the Export Alabama team, AITC provides input that helps drive the Governor's Annual Trade Strategy.

== See also ==
- SBA 504 Loan
- The University of Alabama
- Small Business Administration
- Export-Import Bank of the United States
- New York State Small Business Development Center
