= Community Advantage Loan =

The U.S. Small Business Administration Community Advantage Loan program is designed for new and existing businesses that need loans under $250,000. The loan can be used to finance a startup company or expand an existing small business or buy real estate. The SBA guarantees 85 percent of loans up to $150,000 and 75 percent of loans greater than $150,000.

Launched in 2011, the Community Advantage program intends to expand access to capital in underserved communities by allowing mission-focused, community-based financial institutions – including a Certified Development Company – to offer this loan to small businesses. Greater access to credit can help spur firms to grow and hire, giving the economy a boost.

The SBA designates specific lenders throughout the United States to offer Community Advantage loans. The first six lenders selected for the program were: CDC Small Business Finance, California; Cen-Tex CDC, Texas; The Progress Fund in Greensburg, Pennsylvania; Eastern Maine Development Corporation, Maine; Idaho-Nevada Community Development Financial Institution, Idaho; Kentucky Highlands Investment Corporation, Kentucky. Thirty-four other lenders have since been approved.

== Loan Size and Terms ==
- Maximum Loan Size: $250,000
- Terms: 7–10 years for working capital, inventory, business acquisitions, tenant improvements, and start-up expenses
- Terms: 25 years for real estate
- Interest Rate: up to Prime + 6%
- No pre-payment penalties

== Eligibility ==
There are specific eligibility criteria for the Community Advantage loan, which include credit history, cash flow and industry experience. A designated Community Advantage lender can help a small business owner determine if they can qualify by reviewing an eligibility form.
