= New York State Small Business Development Center =

New York Small Business Development Centers
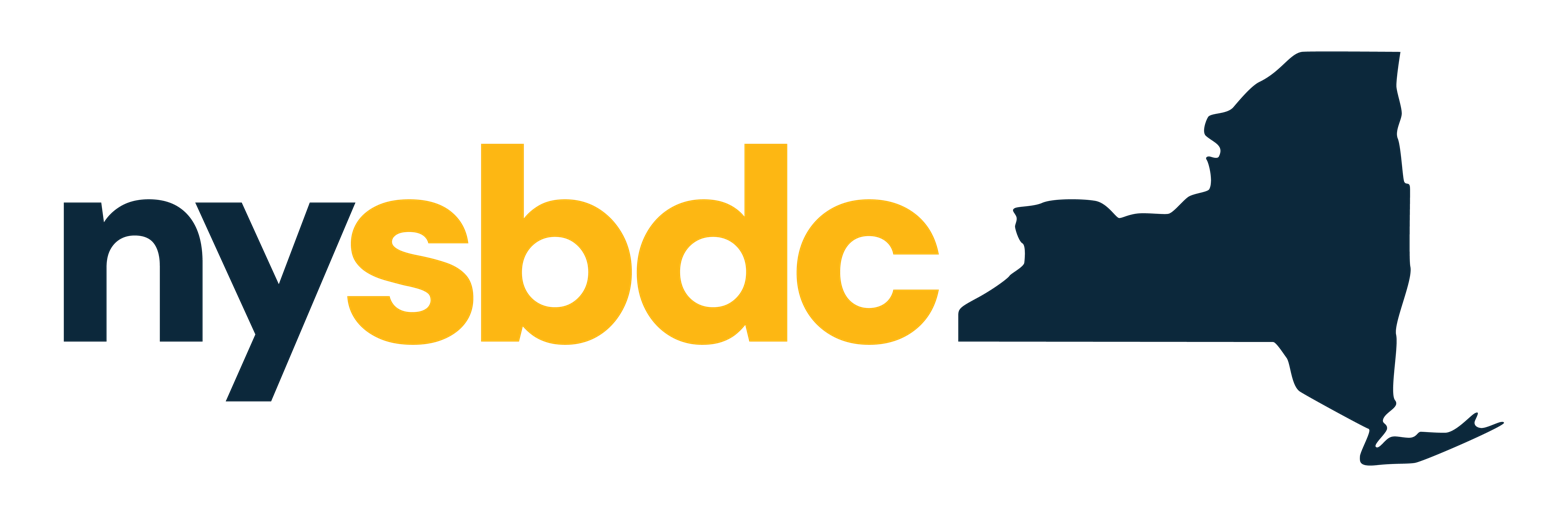
- NYSBDC Logo

Agency overview
- Formed: 1984
- Headquarters: Albany, NY
- Parent agency: U.S. Small Business Administration
- Website: NYSBDC Homepage

The New York Small Business Development Centers (NYSBDC) is a partnership program that provides business advising and training to small business owners and entrepreneurs across New York State. Established in 1984, it is part of the national network of Small Business Development Centers (SBDCs) and is primarily funded by the U.S. Small Business Administration (SBA), the State of New York, and host institutions. The NYSBDC is administered by the State University of New York (SUNY) system. It is an accredited member of the national Association of Small Business Development Centers.

== Overview ==
The NYSBDC operates as a decentralized network with 20 regional centers and numerous outreach offices hosted by SUNY and other higher education institutions across New York State. These centers offer no-cost counseling and low-cost training to aspiring and existing small business owners. Services are tailored to assist businesses at various stages, from startups to established companies seeking growth or operational improvements. Key areas of assistance include business plan development, financial management, marketing and sales, operations, and access to capital. The program emphasizes contributing to the economic growth of New York State by supporting small and medium-sized enterprises.

According to the Association of Small Business Development Centers, SBDCs nationally provide educational assistance to strengthen small and medium-sized business management, contributing to local, state, and national economic growth.

== History ==
The New York Small Business Development Center was founded in 1984 as part of a nationwide initiative by the Small Business Administration to foster small business growth and economic development. The program's establishment in New York coincided with a broader national effort to decentralize business assistance and provide localized support to entrepreneurs. Administered through the State University of New York system, the NYSBDC leveraged the resources and infrastructure of SUNY campuses across the state to establish a widespread network of service centers.

Early initiatives focused on providing basic business counseling and training to help small businesses start and grow. In 1991, the NYSBDC Central Office established a Central Library to support its personnel with reference services and resource management. This was followed by the creation of a research unit in 1993, which addressed approximately 7,000 information requests annually from SBDCs across the United States, demonstrating the NYSBDC's role in the national SBDC network's knowledge infrastructure.

The NYSBDC played a significant role in disaster recovery efforts following the September 11 attacks. In 2001, the LaGuardia Community College SBDC was specifically established as part of the program's response to the economic disruption caused by the attacks, highlighting the NYSBDC's adaptability to regional economic crises.

== Focus on leading industries ==
More recently, the NYSBDC has emphasized specialized programs and initiatives that align with key industries in New York State, including advanced manufacturing, agribusiness, clean energy, life sciences, and technology. The network has also shifted its focus from primarily supporting startups to assisting businesses in the growth stage, helping them scale operations, increase market reach, and adopt innovative practices. Additionally, the NYSBDC provides targeted resources and training to help businesses navigate economic fluctuations and technological advancements.

== Regional centers and notable changes ==
The NYSBDC network comprises 20 regional centers hosted by various institutions across New York State. These centers are strategically located to serve diverse regional economies, from urban centers to rural communities. As of 2023, notable centers include:

- Buffalo: Hosted by University at Buffalo, serving Western New York.
- Capital Region: Hosted by the University at Albany, serving the Capital Region.
- Long Island: Hosted by Stony Brook University, serving Suffolk county and Farmingdale State College, serving Nassau County.
- Lower Hudson Valley: Formerly the Rockland SBDC has moved to St. Thomas Aquinas College, serving businesses in the Rockland County region.
- Manhattan: Hosted by Baruch College, CUNY, serving the financial and commercial hub of Manhattan.
- Mid-Town Manhattan: Hosted by Pace University, CUNY, serving Brooklyn and downtown Manhattan.
- North Central SBDC, formerly Onondaga SBDC: Hosted by Onondaga Community College, serving Central and Northern New York.
- Southern Tier: Hosted by Binghamton University, serving the Southern Tier.

Recent network adjustments have included the closure of the Columbia-Harlem SBDC, reflecting ongoing adaptations to better serve the evolving needs of New York's small business landscape. A complete directory of current NYSBDC centers and outreach offices is available on the organization's official website.

== Leadership ==
The NYSBDC has seen several leadership transitions throughout its history. Notable recent directors include:

- Jim King: Served as State Director until 2021.
- Brian Goldstein: Briefly held the State Director position in 2021.
- Sonya Smith: Appointed State Director in 2022.

== Impact and Recognition ==
The NYSBDC plays a significant role in the New York State economy by supporting small businesses, which are a major driver of job creation and innovation. While specific comprehensive impact studies solely focused on NYSBDC are less readily available in broad public sources, the national SBDC network as a whole has demonstrated substantial economic impact. Studies and reports from organizations like the Government Accountability Office and independent research groups highlight the SBDC network's positive contributions to small business survival rates, job creation, and revenue growth across the United States. Individual success stories of businesses assisted by NYSBDC are often featured on the NYSBDC website and in local news outlets, showcasing the program's tangible benefits to entrepreneurs and local communities throughout New York.

The NYSBDC's consistent operation since 1984 and its integration within the SUNY system and the national SBDC network indicate its established presence and ongoing relevance in the small business support ecosystem of New York.

== See also ==
- SCORE Association
- SBA 504 Loan
