= University of Alabama =

Public university in Tuscaloosa, Alabama, US

The University of Alabama
- University of Alabama Seal
- Type: Public research university
- Established: December 18, 1820; 205 years ago
- Parent institution: University of Alabama System
- Accreditation: SACS
- Academic affiliations: ORAU; URA; Sea grant; Space grant
- Endowment: $2.59 billion (2025) (system-wide)
- President: Peter J. Mohler
- Academic staff: 1,986 (1,517 full-time & 469 part-time)
- Students: 42,360 (fall 2025)
- Undergraduates: 36,160 (fall 2025)
- Postgraduates: 6,200 (fall 2025)
- Location: Tuscaloosa, Alabama, United States; 33°12′39″N 87°32′46″W
- Campus: 1,970 acres (8.0 km^{2})
- Newspaper: The Crimson White
- Colors: Crimson and white
- Nickname: Crimson Tide
- Sporting affiliations: NCAA Division I FBS – SEC
- Mascot: Big Al
- Website: www.ua.edu

The University of Alabama (informally known as Alabama, UA, the Capstone, or Bama) is a public research university in Tuscaloosa, Alabama, United States. Established in 1820 and opened to students in 1831, the University of Alabama is the oldest and largest of the public universities in Alabama as well as the University of Alabama System. It is classified among "R1: Doctoral Universities – Very high research activity".

The university offers programs of study in 12 academic divisions leading to bachelor's, master's, education specialist, and doctoral degrees. The only publicly supported law school in the state is at UA. The school was a center of activity during the American Civil War and the civil rights movement. The University of Alabama varsity football program (nicknamed the Crimson Tide), inaugurated in 1892, ranks as one of the ten best in US history. In a 1913 speech, UA president George H. Denny extolled the university as the "capstone of the public school system in the state", thereby establishing the university's current nickname, The Capstone. As of fall 2025, UA has produced 16 Truman Scholars, 45 Hollings Scholars, 21 Boren Scholars, and 69 Goldwater Scholars.

== History ==
=== Establishment ===
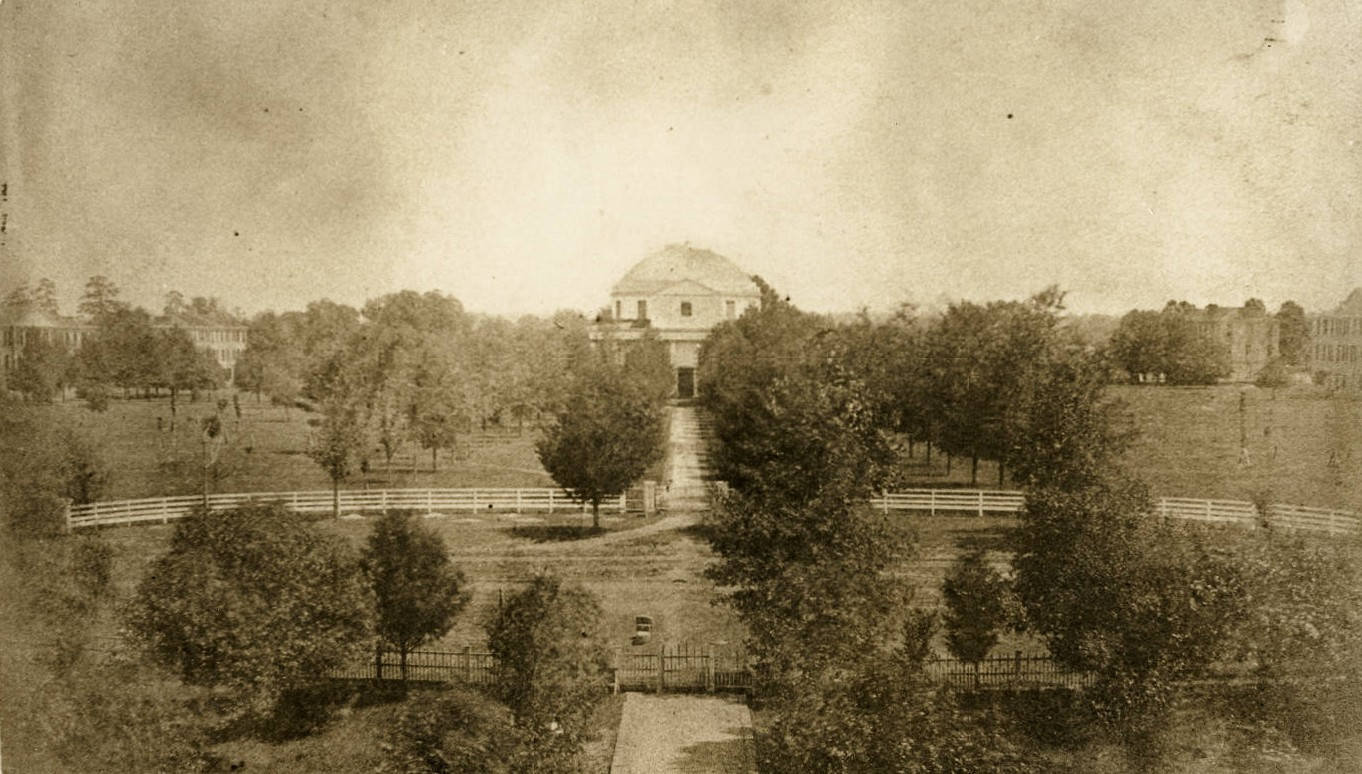
View of the Quad in 1859. The Rotunda can be seen at center, with the halls visible in the background. All buildings depicted were destroyed on April 4, 1865.

In 1818, the United States Congress authorized the newly created Alabama Territory to set aside a township for the establishment of a "seminary of learning". When Alabama was admitted to the Union in 1819, a second township was added to the land grant, bringing it to a total of 46,000 acres (186 km^{2}). The General Assembly of Alabama established the seminary on December 18, 1820, named it "The University of the State of Alabama," and created a board of trustees to manage the construction and operation of the university. The site the board chose for the campus was, at the time, outside the city limits of the erstwhile state capital, Tuscaloosa. William Nichols, the architect of the Alabama State Capitol building in Tuscaloosa, was chosen to design the campus. Influenced by Thomas Jefferson's plan at the University of Virginia, the Nichols-designed campus featured a 70-foot (21 m) wide, 70-foot (21 m) high domed Rotunda that served as the library and nucleus of the campus.

The university's charter was presented to the first university president in the nave of Christ Episcopal Church. UA opened its doors to students on April 18, 1831, with Alva Woods as president. An academy-style institution during the antebellum period, the university emphasized the classics and the social and natural sciences. There were around 100 students per year at UA in the 1830s.

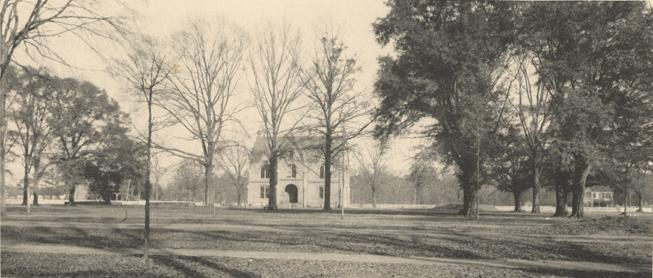
A view of either Tuomey Hall or Oliver-Barnard Hall, one of the first buildings constructed after the university reopened after the Civil War, in 1907

As the state and university matured, an active literary culture evolved on campus and in Tuscaloosa. UA had one of the largest libraries in the country on the eve of the Civil War with more than 7,000 volumes. There were several thriving literary societies, including the Erosophic and the Phi Beta Kappa societies, which often had lectures by such distinguished politicians and literary figures as United States Supreme Court justice John Archibald Campbell, novelist William Gilmore Simms, and professor Frederick Barnard. The addresses to those societies reveal a vibrant intellectual culture in Tuscaloosa; they also illustrate the proslavery ideas that were so central to the university and the state.

Discipline and student behavior were major issues at the university almost from the day it opened. Early presidents attempted to enforce strict rules regarding conduct. Students were prohibited from drinking, swearing, making unauthorized visits off-campus, or playing musical instruments for more than an hour at a time. Still, riots and gunfights were not uncommon. To combat the severe discipline problem, president Landon Garland received approval from the legislature in 1860 to transform the university into a military school.

=== From the Civil War to World War II ===
Many of the cadets who graduated from the school served as officers in the Confederate Army during the Civil War. As a consequence of that role, Union troops burned the campus on April 4, 1865, only five days before Lee's surrender at Appomattox Court House. Despite a call to arms and defense by the student cadet corps, only four buildings survived the burning: the President's Mansion (1841), Gorgas House (1829), Little Round House (1860), and Old Observatory (1844). The university reopened in 1871 and in 1880 Congress granted the university 40,000 acres (162 km^{2}) of coal land in partial compensation for war damages.

The University of Alabama enrolled female students beginning in 1892. The board of trustees allowed female students largely because of Julia S. Tutwiler, with the conditions that they be over eighteen, and would be allowed to enter the sophomore class after completing their first year at another school and passing an exam. Ten women from Tutwiler's Livingston school enrolled for the 1893 fall semester. By 1897, women were allowed to enroll as freshmen.

During World War II, UA was one of 131 colleges and universities nationally that took part in the V-12 Navy College Training Program, which offered students a path to a Navy commission. During this time the University of Alabama had extensions in other cities including Mobile; the Mobile extension was replaced by the University of South Alabama which opened in 1963.

=== Racial integration ===
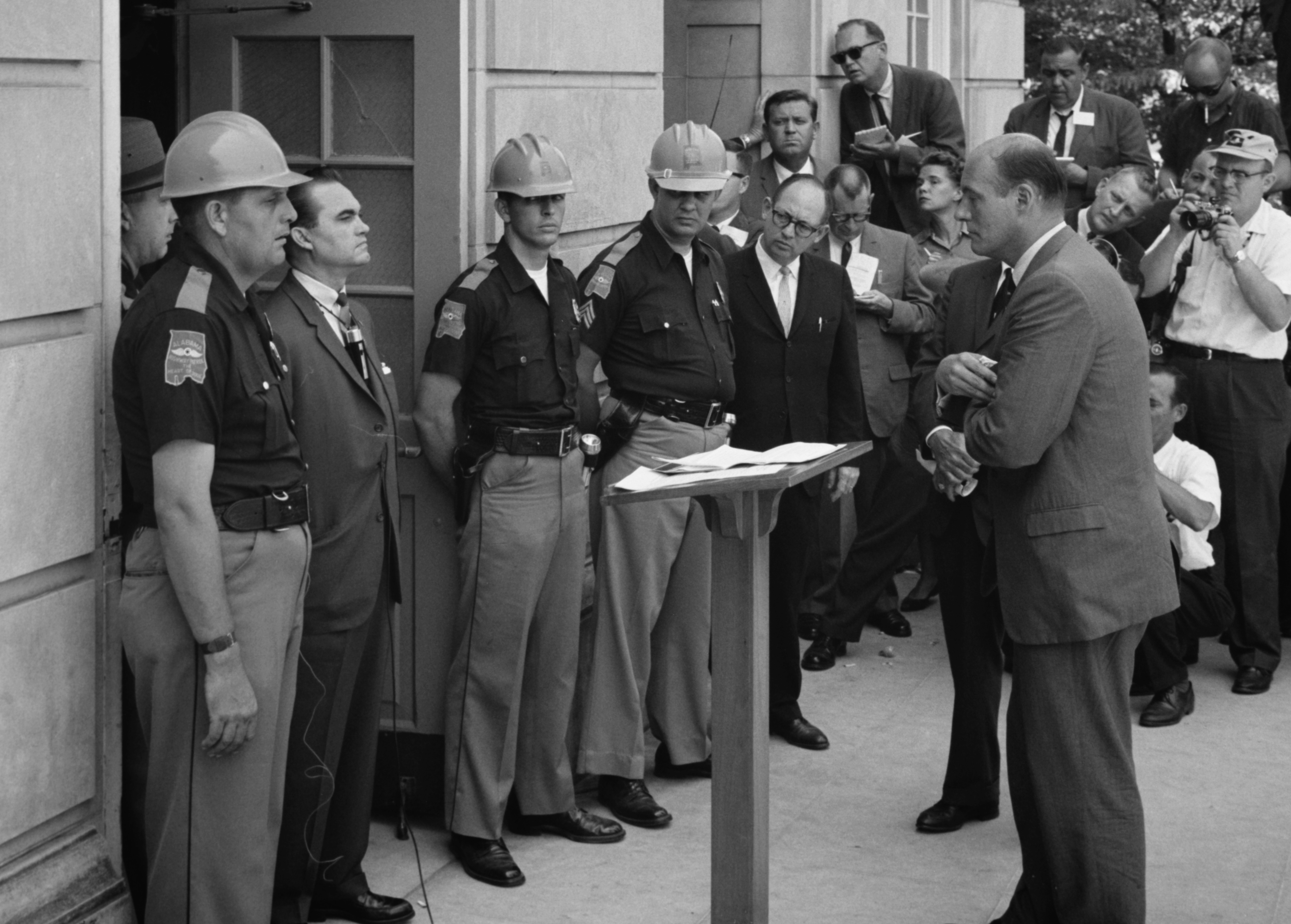
George Wallace's "stand in the schoolhouse door" to attempt to stop integration of other races at the University of Alabama.

Until the 1960s, the university admitted only white students (with one temporary exception). The practice of racial segregation was common in the American South at this time and the university barred all students of color from attending. The first attempt to integrate the university occurred in 1956 when Autherine Lucy successfully enrolled on February 3 as a graduate student in library sciences after she secured a court order preventing the university from rejecting her application on the basis of race. In the face of violent protests against her attendance, Lucy was suspended (and later outright expelled) three days later by the board of trustees on the basis of being unable to provide a safe learning environment for her. The university was not integrated until 1963 when Vivian Malone and James Hood registered for classes on June 11.

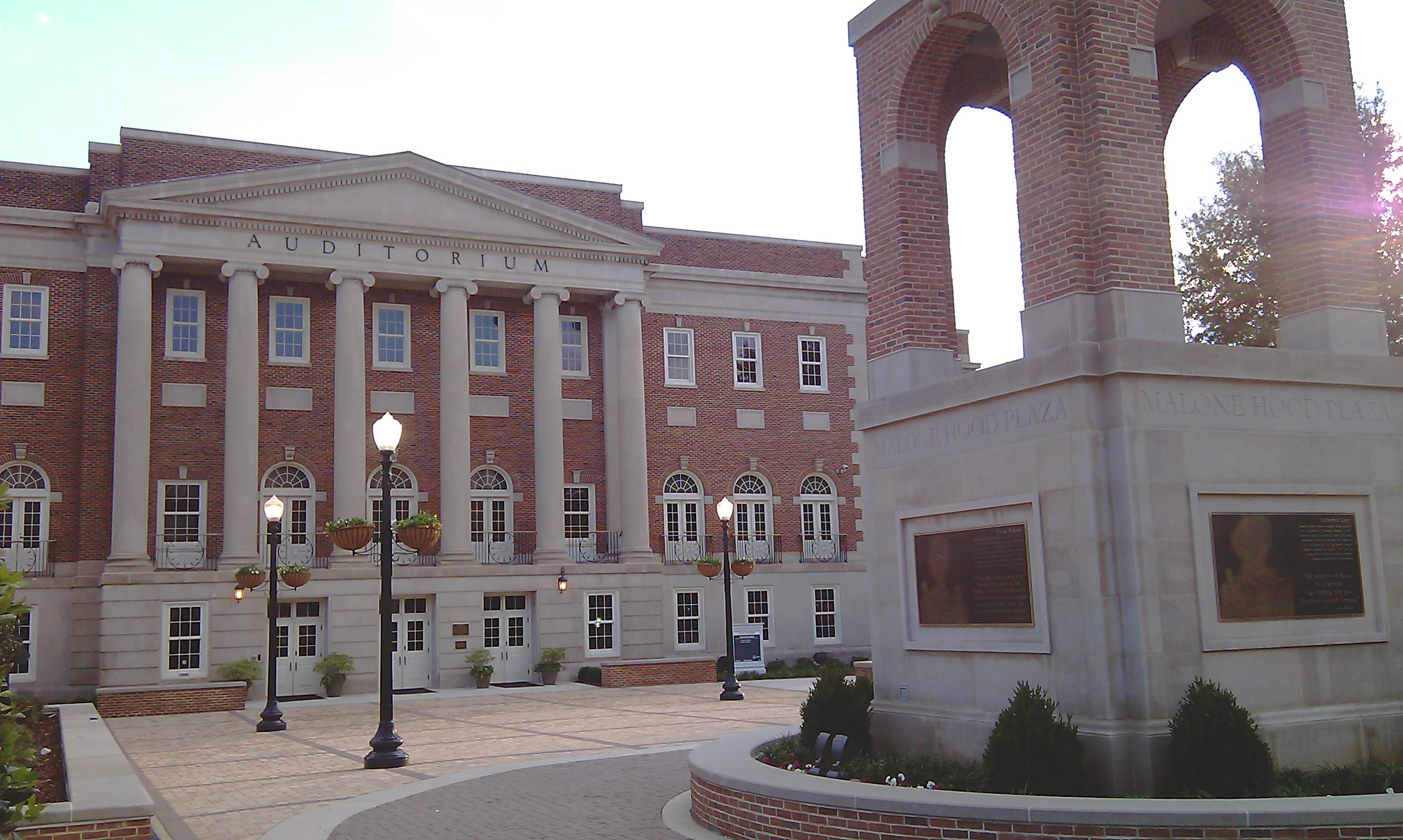
Foster Auditorium and Malone-Hood Plaza today. Lucy Clock Tower is in the foreground.

Governor George Wallace made his infamous "Stand in the Schoolhouse Door", standing in the front entrance of Foster Auditorium in a symbolic attempt to stop Malone and Hood's enrollment. When confronted by U.S. Deputy Attorney General Nicholas Katzenbach and federal marshals sent in by U.S. Attorney General Robert F. Kennedy, Wallace stepped aside. President John F. Kennedy had called for the integration of the University of Alabama as well. Although Hood dropped out after two months, he returned and, in 1997, received his doctorate. Malone persisted in her studies and became the first African American to graduate from the university. In 2000, the university granted her a doctorate of humane letters. Autherine Lucy's expulsion was rescinded in 1980, and she re-enrolled and graduated with a master's degree in 1992. Later in his life, Wallace apologized for his opposition to racial integration. In 2010, the university formally honored Lucy, Hood and Malone by rechristening the plaza in front of Foster Auditorium as Malone-Hood Plaza and erecting a clock tower – Autherine Lucy Clock Tower – in the plaza. In 2019 Autherine Lucy was presented with a doctorate of humane letters, and in 2022 the education building in which she sheltered during the protests was renamed in her honor.

Archie Wade became the first African-American faculty member of the university in 1970 when he was hired by the College of Education. He retired from the university in 2000.

=== 2011 tornado ===
On April 27, 2011, Tuscaloosa was hit by a tornado rated EF4 on the Enhanced Fujita scale, killing six students who lived off campus. The campus grounds were not damaged by the storm, but the university canceled the rest of the spring semester and postponed graduation because of damage to approximately 11% of the city and the loss of life.

== Campus ==
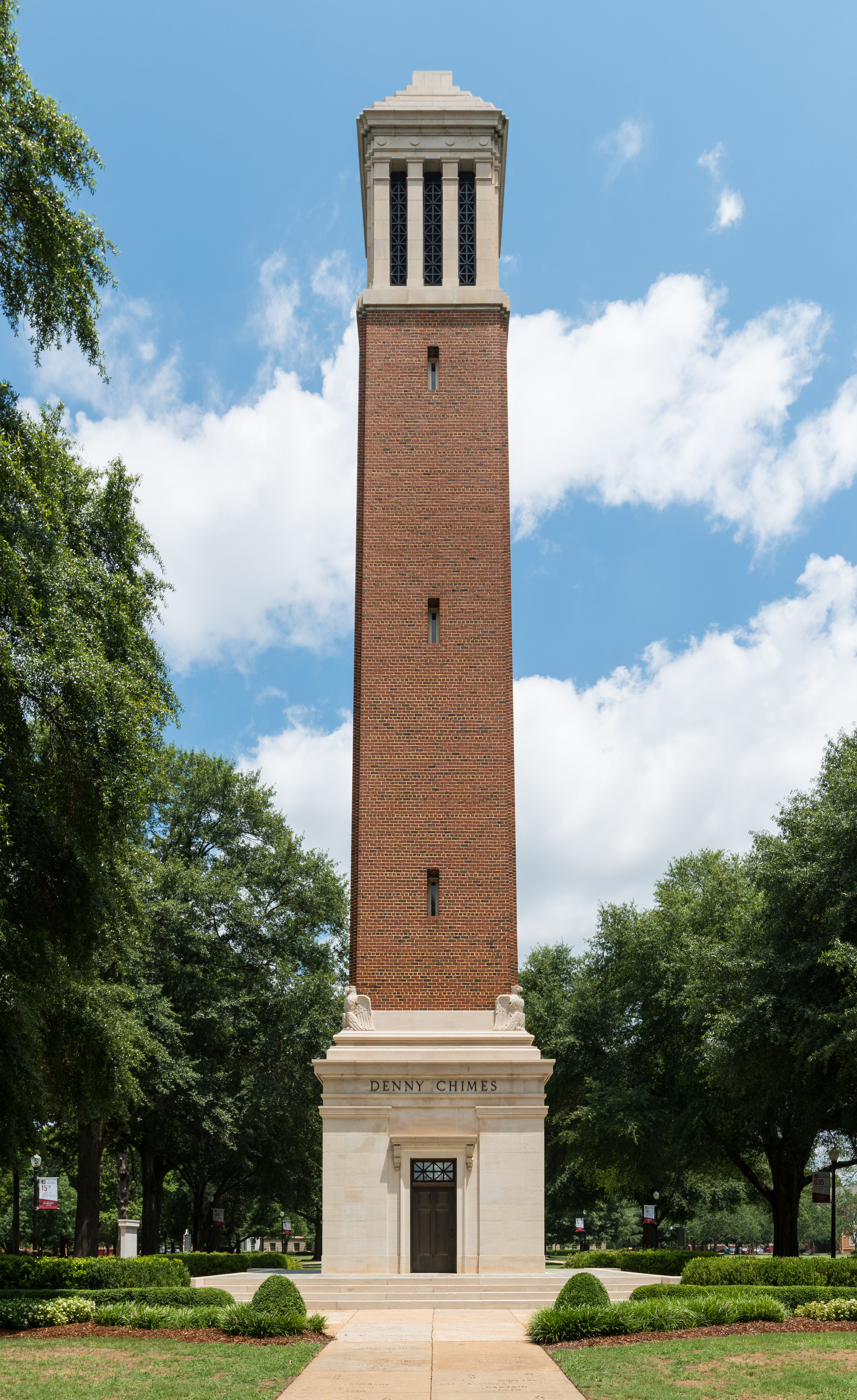
Denny Chimes on the Quad

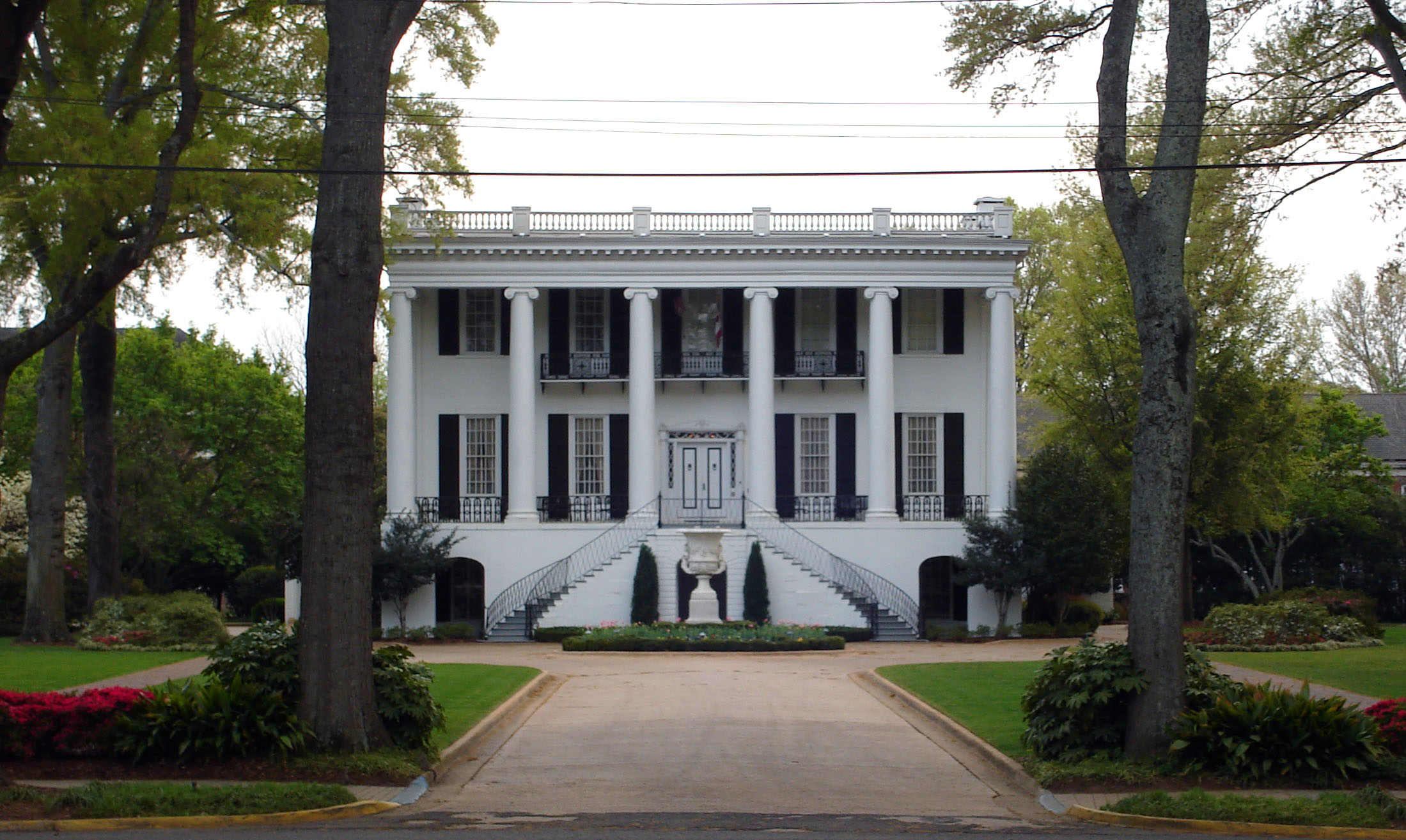
The President's Mansion, opposite Denny Chimes

From a small campus of seven buildings in the wilderness on the main road between Tuscaloosa and Huntsville (now University Boulevard) in the 1830s, UA has grown to a massive 1,970-acre (800 ha) campus in the heart of Tuscaloosa. There are 297 buildings on campus containing some 10,600,000 square feet (980,000 m^{2}) of space. In 2010, the school added 168 acres to its campus by purchasing the land formerly belonging to Bryce Hospital. It also plans to acquire more land to accommodate the continuing growth of the enrollment.

The university maintains the University of Alabama Arboretum in eastern Tuscaloosa and the Dauphin Island Sea Lab on Dauphin Island, just off the Alabama Gulf Coast. In 2011, the Sustainable Endowments Institute gave the university a College Sustainability Report Card grade of "B+".

In 2026, the university began construction the Smith Family Center for Performing Arts to consolidate the Department of Theatre and Dance's performance, instructional, and production facilities.

=== Landmarks ===
UA is home to several museums, cultural facilities and historical landmarks.

The Alabama Museum of Natural History at Smith Hall exhibits Alabama's rich natural history. The oddest artifact there could be the Sylacauga meteorite, the largest known extraterrestrial object to strike a human being who survived. The Paul W. Bryant Museum houses memorabilia and exhibits on the history of UA athletic programs, most notably the tenure of football coach Paul "Bear" Bryant. Athletic trophies and awards are displayed at the Mal Moore Athletic Facility. The Sarah Moody Gallery of Art at Garland Hall hosts revolving exhibitions of contemporary art, including from the university's own permanent collection. The Jones Archaeological Museum at Moundville exhibits the history of Mississippian culture in Alabama.

Numerous historical landmarks dot the campus, including the President's Mansion, Denny Chimes, Foster Auditorium (a National Historical Landmark), the Gorgas–Manly Historic District, and Maxwell Observatory.

A cemetery next to the Math and Science Education Building includes the graves of two enslaved persons who were owned by faculty members before the Civil War. Both men died in the 1840s, and their graves went unmarked until 2004.

Campus culture facilities include the Allen Bales Theatre, the Marion Gallaway Theatre, the English Building auditorium, and the Frank M. Moody Music Building, which houses the Tuscaloosa Symphony Orchestra as well as three resident choirs. The UA Opera Theatre performs in Bryant-Jordan Hall.

== Organization and administration ==
UA Academic Divisions
College/school	Created
College of Arts and Sciences	1909
Culverhouse College of Business	1919
College of Communication and Information Sciences	1997
College of Community Health Sciences*	1971
College of Education	1928
Styslinger College of Engineering	1909
Graduate School	1924
Honors College**	2003
College of Human Environmental Sciences	1987
School of Law	1892
Capstone College of Nursing	1975
School of Social Work	1975
*Degree-granting unit of UAB
**Not a degree-granting unit

The University of Alabama is an autonomous institution within the University of Alabama System and governed by the Board of Trustees of The University of Alabama and headed by the chancellor of The University of Alabama. The state legislature created the board to govern the university's operations. Its responsibilities include setting policy for the university, determining the university's mission and scope, and assuming responsibility for the university to the public and the legislature. The board is self-perpetuating and composed of 15 members and two ex officio members. The Constitution of the State of Alabama dictates the board's makeup and requires the board to include three members from the congressional district that contains the Tuscaloosa campus and two members from every other congressional district in Alabama. Board members are elected by the board and are confirmed by the Alabama State Senate.

The president of the University of Alabama is the principal executive officer of the university and is appointed by the chancellor with approval of the board of trustees. Stuart R. Bell became the 29th president on July 15, 2015.

=== Faculty and Staff ===
In fall 2023, UA employed 7,472 employees, including 2,117 instructional staff (faculty), 2,631 professional staff, and more than 2,600 office, clerical, technical and service staff.

=== Colleges and academic divisions ===
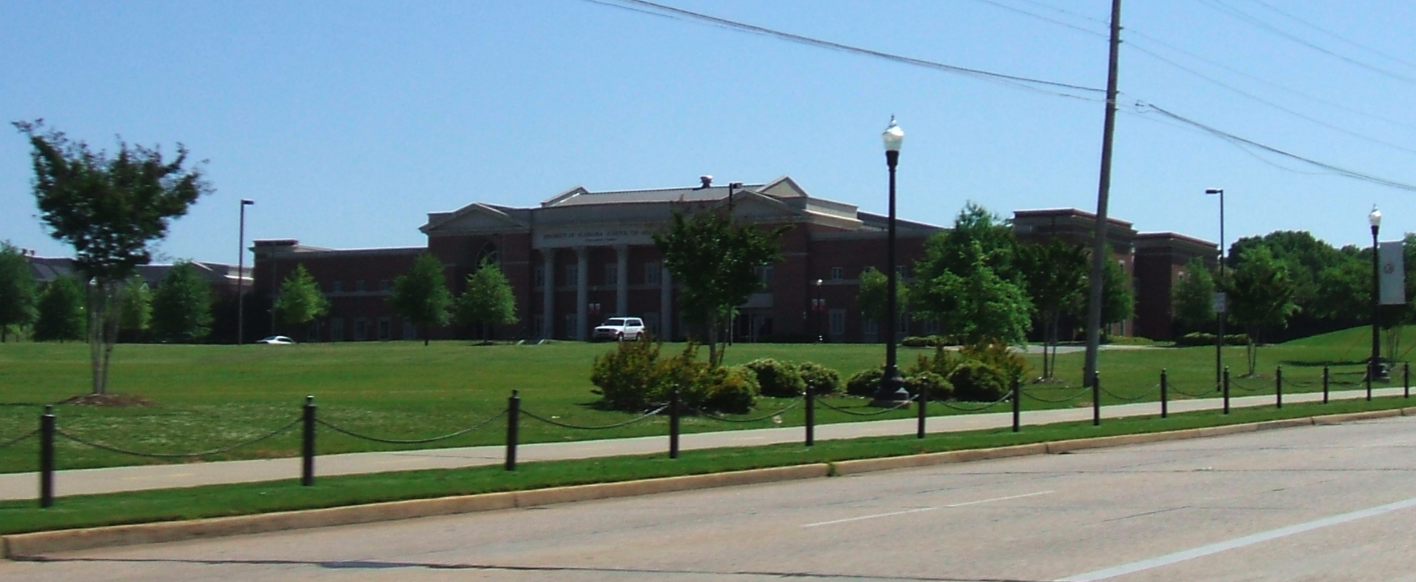
School of Medicine – Tuscaloosa Branch

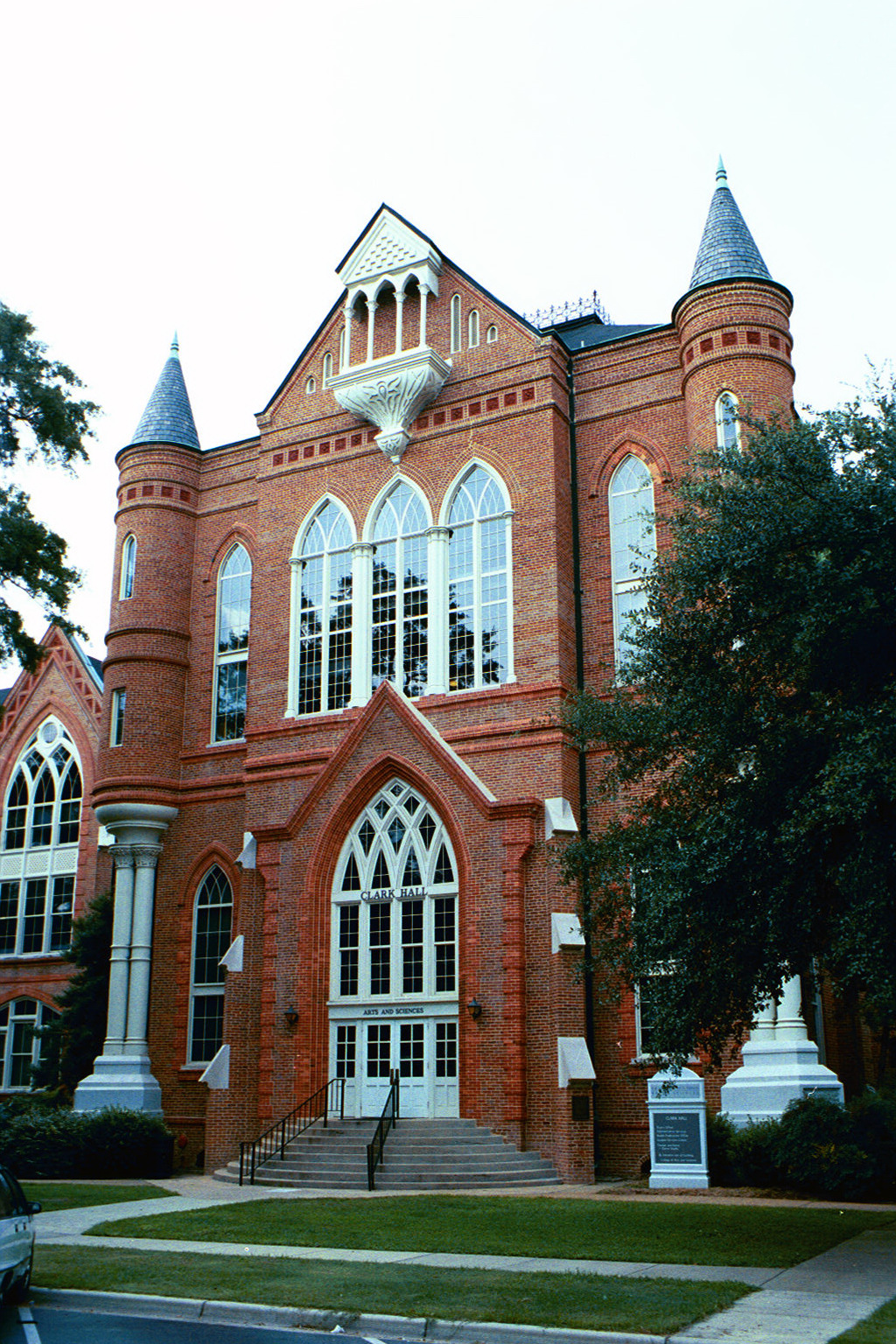
Clark Hall is home of the College of Arts and Sciences

The College of Arts and Sciences is the university's college for the liberal arts, fine arts, and sciences. It is the largest of the university's 12 colleges, with approximately 7,900 undergraduate students and 1,100 graduate students. Most core curriculum classes and majors and minors are part of the college.

There are 11 other academic divisions at the University of Alabama (see the table above). Eight divisions (Arts and Sciences, Business, Communication and Information Sciences, Education, Engineering, Human Environmental Sciences, Nursing, and Social Work) grant undergraduate degrees. Degrees in those eight divisions at the master's, specialist, and doctoral level are awarded through the Graduate School. The law school offers JD and LL.M. degree programs. The College of Community Health Sciences provides advanced studies in medicine and related disciplines and operates a family medicine residency program. Medical students are also trained in association with the University of Alabama School of Medicine, from which they receive their degree.

Founded in 1971 and merged into the College of Arts and Sciences in 1996, the New College's stated objectives were to "create an opportunity for a highly individualized education that enables students to draw from the resources of all University classes and faculty" and to "serve as an experimental unit with the expectation of exporting successful innovations to other sectors of the University". The college allows undergraduate students flexibility in choosing their curriculum while completing a Bachelor of Arts or Bachelor of Science degree in interdisciplinary studies. The New College Review, a non-fiction cultural journal, is written, edited, designed, and published by students.

=== Endowment ===
The University of Alabama System's financial endowment was valued at $2.588 billion in 2025 according to the 2025 NACUBO-Commonfund Study of Endowments (NCSE). As of March 2022, UA's portion of the system's endowment exceeded $1 billion.

== Academics ==
=== Undergraduate admissions ===
Undergraduate admissions statistics
- 2021 entering class
- Admit rate: 78.9 (▲ +26.3)
- Yield rate: 22.7 (▼ −14.9)

Test scores middle 50%
- SAT Total: 1080-1370 (among 17% of FTFs)
- ACT Composite: 21-31 (among 63% of FTFs)

In fall 2021, Alabama received 42,421 applications for first-time freshman enrollment, from which 33,472 applications were accepted (78.9%) and 7,593 freshmen enrolled, a yield rate (the percentage of accepted students who choose to attend the university) of 22.7%. Alabama's freshman retention rate is 88.6%, with 72.1% going on to graduate within six years.

The university started test-optional admissions with the Fall 2021 incoming class and has extended this through Fall 2024. Of the 63% of enrolled freshmen in 2021 who submitted ACT scores, the middle 50 percent composite score was between 21 and 31. Of the 17% of the incoming freshman class who submitted SAT scores, the middle 50 percent composite scores were 1080–1370.

The University of Alabama is a college-sponsor of the National Merit Scholarship Program and sponsored 189 Merit Scholarship awards in 2020. In the 2020–2021 academic year, 223 freshman students were National Merit Scholars.

Fall First-Time Freshman Statistics
	2021	2020	2019	2018	2017	2016
Applicants	42,421	39,560	38,505	37,302	38,129	38,237
Admits	33,472	31,804	31,835	22,032	21,344	20,107
Admit rate	78.9	80.4	82.7	59.0	56.0	52.6
Enrolled	7,593	6,507	6,764	6,663	7,407	7,559
Yield rate	22.7	20.5	21.2	30.2	34.7	37.6
ACT composite* (out of 36)	21–31 (63%^{†})	23–31 (77%^{†})	23–31 (72%^{†})	23–31 (73%^{†})	23–32 (81%^{†})	23–31 (80%^{†})
SAT composite* (out of 1600)	1080–1370 (17%^{†})	1070–1330 (23%^{†})	1080–1340 (27%^{†})	1060–1280 (25%^{†})	1050–1280 (19%^{†})	—
* middle 50% range^{†} percentage of first-time freshmen who chose to submit

=== Classification ===
The University of Alabama is classified among "R1: Doctoral Universities – Very high research activity". It is a large, four-year primarily residential university accredited by the Southern Association of Colleges and Schools. Full-time, four-year undergraduates comprise a large amount of the university enrollment. The undergraduate instructional program emphasizes professional programs of study as well as the liberal arts, and there is a high level of co-existence between the graduate and undergraduate program. The university has a very high level of research activity and has a "comprehensive doctoral" graduate instructional program in the liberal arts, humanities, social sciences, health sciences (medical school), and STEM fields.

UA began offering engineering classes in 1837. It was one of the first universities in the nation to offer an engineering degree. Over the past decade, UA has greatly expanded its science and engineering programs, in terms of numbers of students, faculty hired, and number and size of new academic/research facilities (almost one million in new square footage). UA's College of Engineering enrolls more students than any other engineering program in the state as of 2016. UA's freshman engineering classes have also had the highest average ACT score among all state of Alabama engineering programs for the last several years.

=== Degrees conferred ===
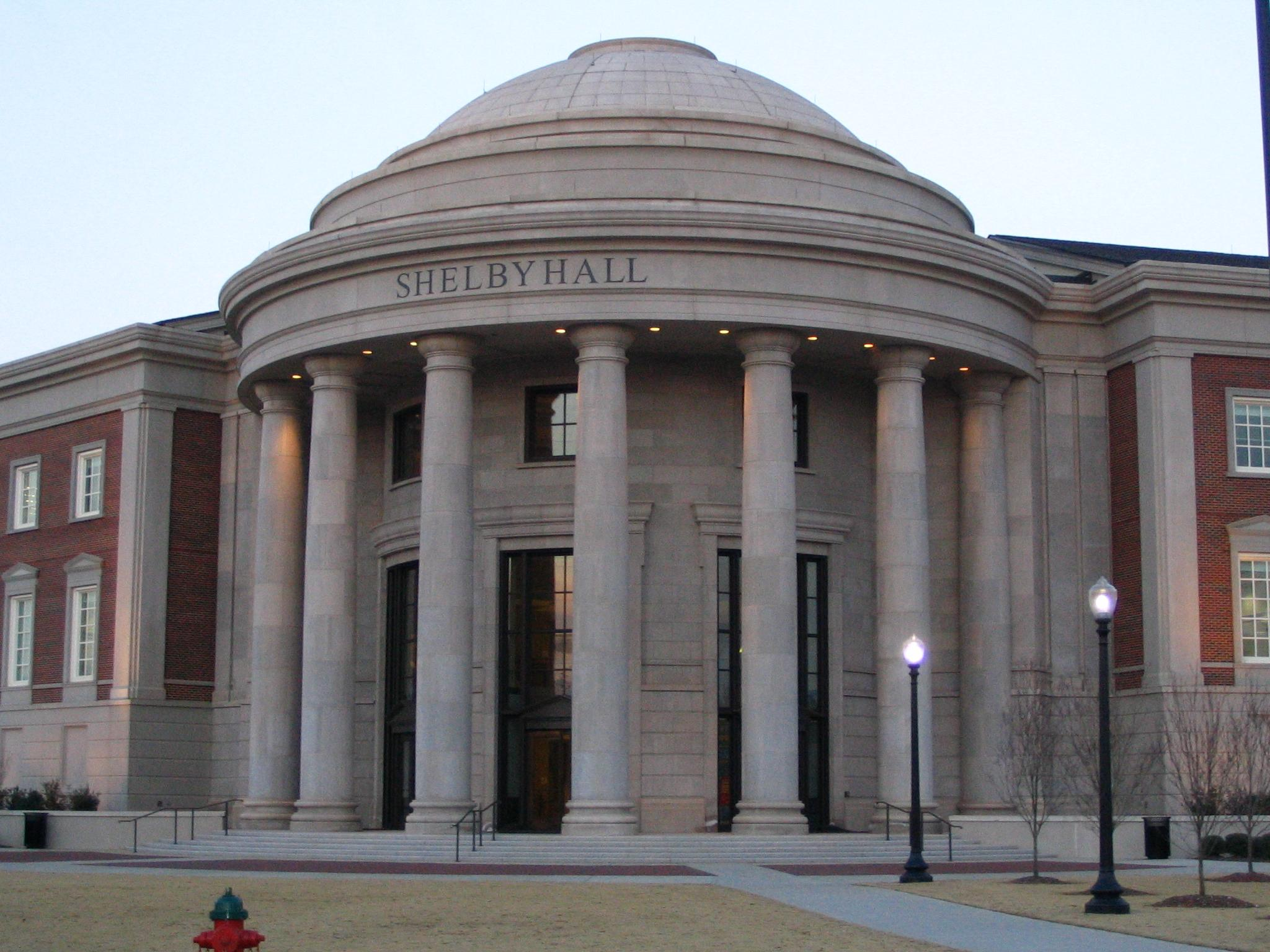
Shelby Hall is the center of the Science and Engineering Complex, a 1,000,000 sq.ft teaching and research facility.

Ten of the university's twelve academic units (see above) offer degree programs across a combined total of 117 areas of study. Two areas, economics and health care management, are offered jointly by separate units (Culverhouse College of Business and Arts & Sciences for both), and one area (material science) is offered jointly by the other universities in the UA system.

UA conferred 9,105 degrees in the 2023–24 academic year, including 6,604 bachelor's degrees (3,579 with Latin honors), 1,192 master's degrees, 300 doctorates, 56 education specialist, and 153 professional degrees.

Latin honors are conferred on graduates completing a bachelor's degree for the first time (including at other universities) with an overall grade point average of at least 3.5. Cum laude honors are conferred to graduates with a GPA of 3.5 or greater and less than 3.7 (without rounding). Magna cum laude honors are conferred with a GPA of 3.7 or greater and less than 3.9. Summa cum laude honors are conferred with a GPA of 3.9 or higher.

=== Rankings ===
Academic rankings

National
- Forbes: 182
- U.S. News & World Report: 171 (tie)
- Washington Monthly: 298
- WSJ/College Pulse: 276

Global
- ARWU: 601-700
- QS: 901-950
- THE: 601–800
- U.S. News & World Report: 653 (tie)

National Program Rankings
Program	Ranking
Biological Sciences	100
Business	54
Chemistry	101
Clinical Psychology	45
Computer Science	110
Earth Sciences	83
Economics	81
Education	61
Engineering	97
English	80
Fine Arts	158
History	75
Law	31
Library & Information Studies	21
Mathematics	91
Physics	113
Political Science	99
Psychology	95
Public Affairs	108
Rehabilitation Counseling	18
Social Work	28
Speech–Language Pathology	65
Statistics	82

Global Program Rankings
Program	Ranking
Chemistry	434
Clinical Medicine	701
Economics & Business	205
Engineering	669
Materials Science	493
Physics	176
Social Sciences & Public Health	387

In the 2023 U.S. News & World Report rankings, UA was tied for 170th in the National Universities category (tied for 91st among "Top Public Schools"). Additionally, in the 2023 U.S. News rankings, the law school was tied for 35th in the nation, the business school was tied for 55th, the education school tied for 56th, and the engineering school was tied for 99th. In 2016, Business Insider ranked the UA law school as the third-best public law school in the nation.

In August 2020, the UA Department of Advertising and Public Relations was named the Most Outstanding Education Program by PRWeek during the 2020 PRWeek Awards. It was the department's ninth recognition as a finalist for the award and first selection as the top program.

As of 2021 The Princeton Review ranked University of Alabama first in the nation as a party school and first for having lots of Greek life. The university was also ranked the eighth-most LGBT unfriendly school in the nation.

=== Libraries ===
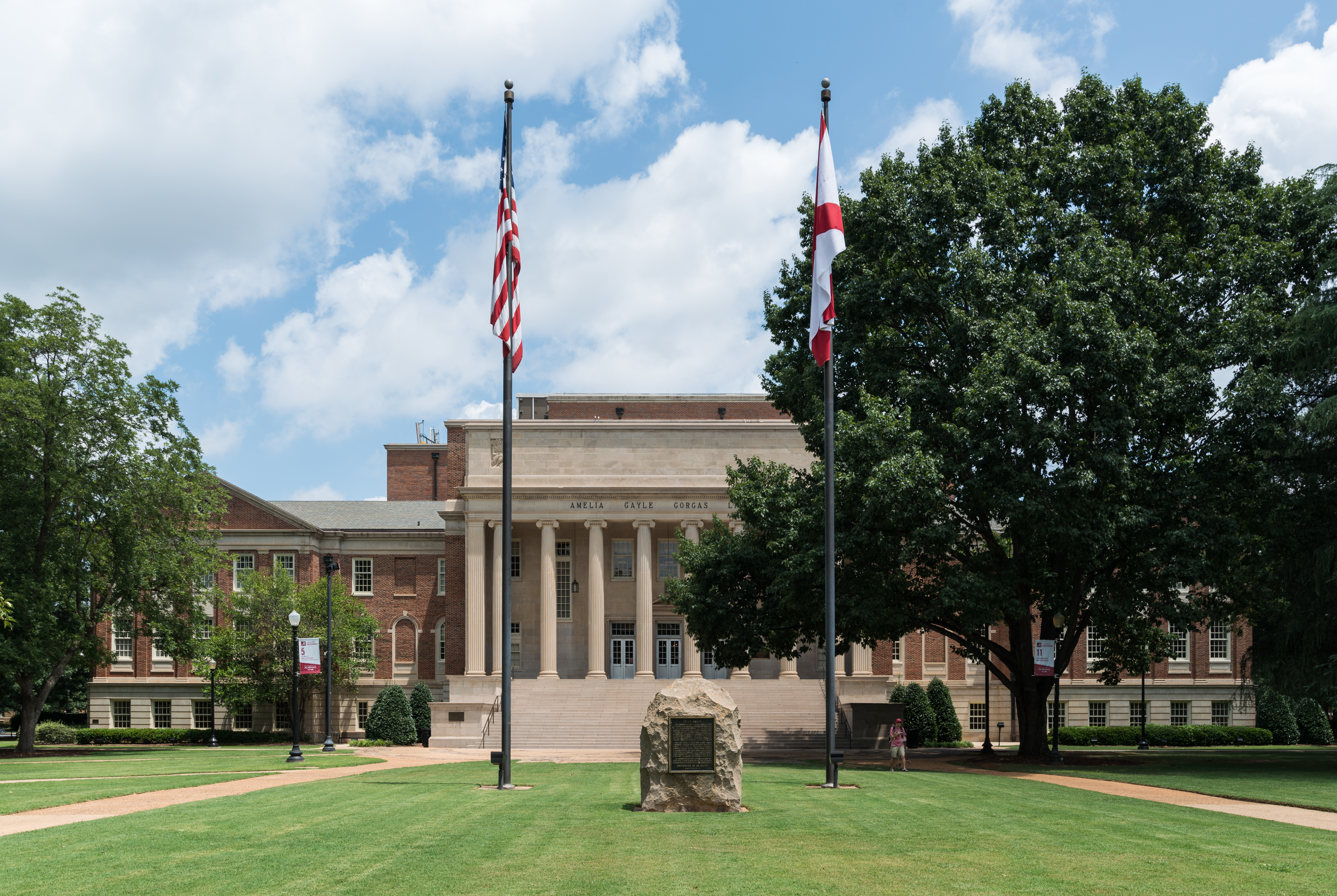
Amelia Gayle Gorgas Library on the Quad

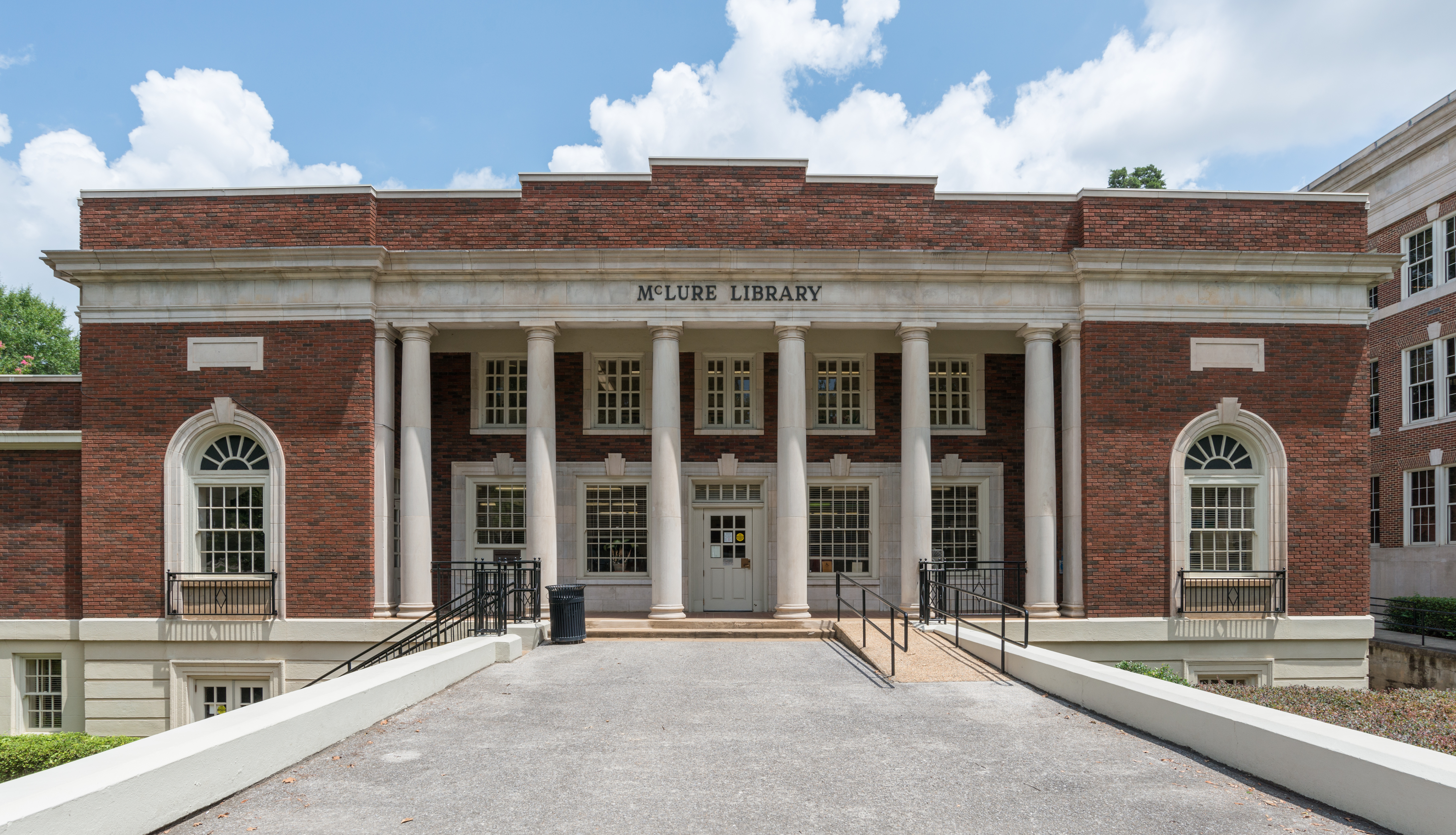
McLure Library in 2016

The University of Alabama has 2.9 million document volumes, along with nearly 100,000 uncatalogued government documents in its collection; of these, 2.5 million volumes are held by the University Libraries. The University Libraries system has six separate libraries.

The Amelia Gayle Gorgas Library, which sits on the Main Quad, is the oldest and largest of the university libraries. Gorgas Library holds the university's collections in the humanities and social sciences, as well as the university's depository of U.S. government documents. The library opened in 1939. A seven-story addition was built on the north side of the library in the 1970s.

The Angelo Bruno Business Library, in the Business Quad, is named after the co-founder of the Bruno's grocery chain who gave the university $4 million to create a library focusing on commerce and business studies. Opened in 1994, the 64,000-square-foot (5,900 m^{2}), three-story facility holds more than 170,000 volumes. Bruno Library also houses the 9,500-square-foot (880 m^{2}) Sloan Y. Bashinsky Sr. Computer Center.

The Eric and Sarah Rodgers Library for Science and Engineering, in the Science and Engineering Quad, is named after two popular, long-time professors of engineering and statistics, respectively. It opened in 1990, combining the Science Library collection in Lloyd Hall and the Engineering Library collection in the Mineral Industries Building (now known as H.M. Comer Hall). Rodgers Library was designed with help from IBM to incorporate the latest in informatics. McLure Education Library was founded in 1954 in a remodeled student union annex (across the street from the old Student Union, now Reese Phifer Hall) and named in 1974 after John Rankin McLure, the longtime dean of the College of Education. The William Stanley Hoole Special Collections Library, which holds the university's collection of rare and historical documents and books, is in Mary Harmon Bryant Hall. The Library Annex holds seldom-used books and journals, as well as other volumes which need special protection, that would otherwise take up valuable space in the libraries.

Other libraries on campus are independent of the University Libraries. The 66,000-square-foot (6,100 m^{2}) Bounds Law Library, at the Law Center, holds more than 300,000 volumes. Established in 1978, the Health Sciences Library, at the University Medical Center, serves students at the College of Community Health Sciences. Its 20,000-volume collection includes clinical medicine, family practice, primary care, medical education, consumer health, and related health care topics. Located in Farah Hall (home of the Department of Geography) the Map Library and Place Names Research Center holds over 270,000 maps and 75,000 aerial photographs. The William E. Winter Reading Room of the College of Communication and Information Sciences is in Reese Phifer Hall and holds more than 10,000 volumes. The School of Social Work Reading Room in Little Hall contains around 200 volumes.

UA is one of the 126 members of the Association of Research Libraries, which yearly compiles internal rankings. In 2011, the University of Alabama ranked 56th among all criteria, a marked improvement over a 2003 ranking of 97th.

In the fall of 2011, the University of Alabama Trustees approved a resolution to expand Gorgas Library by 50,000 square feet (4,600 m^{2}), doubling the seating capacity from 1,139 to 2,278.

=== Research ===
In academic year 2014–2015, UA received $76 million in research contracts and grants. The Alabama International Trade Center and the Center for Advanced Public Safety are two research centers at UA. The US Department of Homeland Security has selected The University of Alabama as a National Center of Academic Excellence (CAE) in Information Assurance Education and Research.

The university owns and manages a 132.5 parcel of land in Dallas County, Alabama in a site known as Harrell Station for paleontological research. 16 species have been described from the site, with 13 still being considered valid. While the site is not accessible to the general public, field trips are sometimes organized for members of the Alabama Paleontological Society and the Birmingham Paleontological Society.

== Student life ==
=== Student body ===
Undergraduate demographics as of Fall 2023
Race and ethnicity	Total
White	72%
Black	11%
Hispanic	7%
Two or more races	4%
Unknown	4%
Asian	1%
International student	1%
Economic diversity
Low-income (Note: The percentage of students who received an income-based federal Pell grant intended for low-income students.)	19%
Affluent (Note: The percentage of students who are a part of the American middle class at the bare minimum.)	81%

In fall 2023, the university had an enrollment of 39,623 students, The record enrollment included 3,184 freshmen from Alabama, representing every county in the state. This marked UA's fifth consecutive year with an in-state increase and the largest number of in-state freshmen since 2010. Alabama residents comprised 41.7% of the undergraduate student body; out-of-state residents comprised 58.3%.

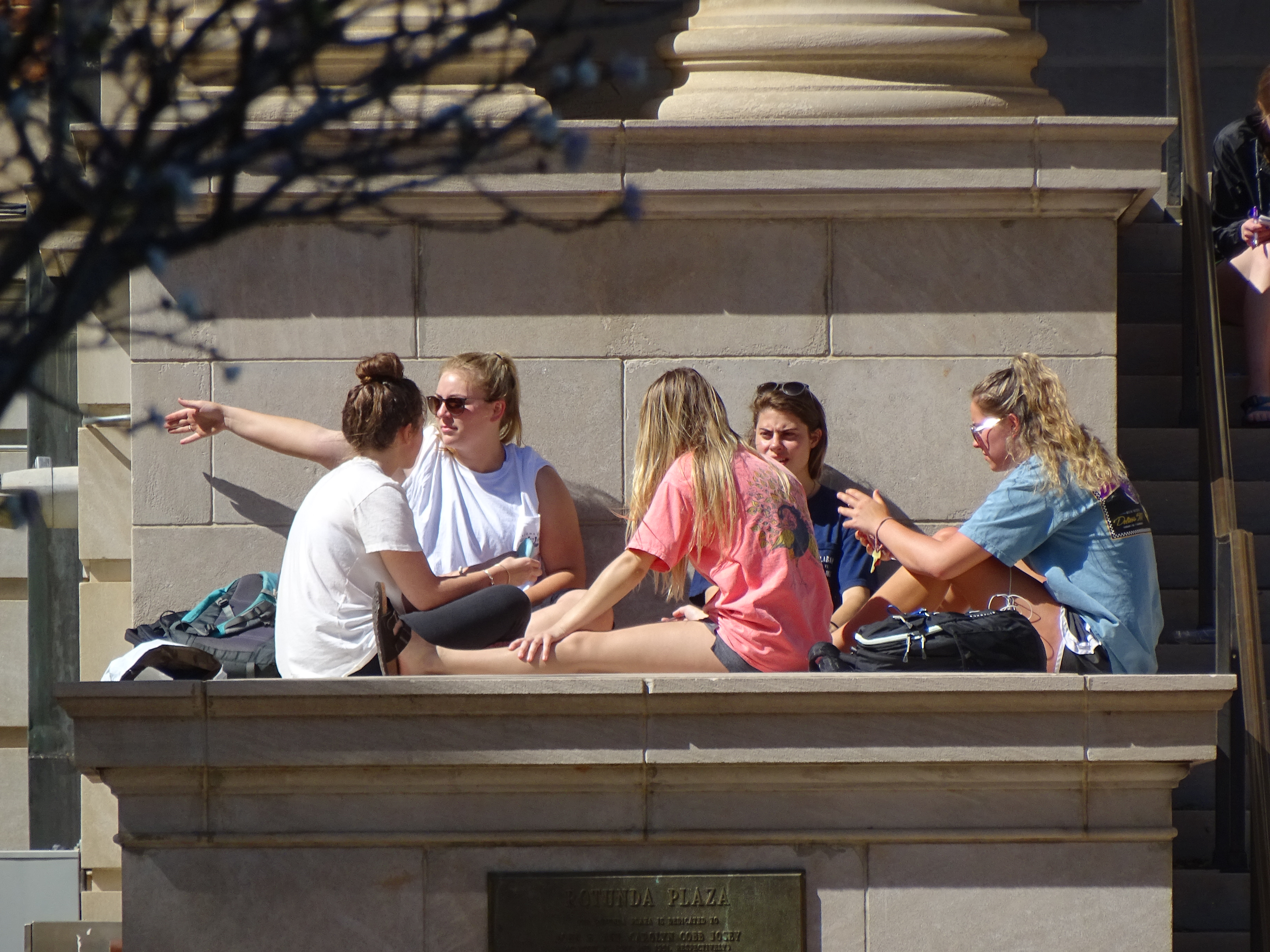
A group of students on campus in 2017

As of January 2026, UA has 1,260 National Merit Scholars enrolled.

Kevin Carey, writing for The Atlantic, claimed that universities like UA "give an effective 45 percent [admissions] bump to the children of the top 1 percent".

=== Residential life ===
Today nearly 30% of students live on campus, including over 90% of first-year freshmen (who are required to live on campus unless they meet the criteria for exemption).

=== Student government ===
The Student Government Association is the primary student advocacy organization at UA. The SGA is governed by the SGA Constitution and consists of a legislative branch, an executive branch and a judicial council.

==== SGA controversy ====
Since its founding in 1914, a secretive coalition of fraternities and sororities, commonly known as "The Machine", has wielded enormous influence over the Student Government Association. Occurrences of harassment, intimidation, and even criminal activities aimed at opposition candidates have been reported. Many figures in local, state, and national politics have come out of the SGA at the University of Alabama. Esquire devoted its April 1992 cover story to an exposé of The Machine. The controversy led to the university disbanding the SGA in 1993, which was not undone until 1996. "Machine" fraternities and sororities have traditionally accepted only white pledges, with only one documented case of an African American student being offered entry, in 2003.

Controversy surrounding The Machine reemerged in August 2013, when sororities and fraternities were mobilized to elect two former SGA presidents, Cason Kirby and Lee Garrison, in closely contested municipal school board races. Before election day, questions about illegal voter registration were raised when evidence emerged that indicated eleven fraternity members fraudulently claimed to be living in a single house in one district. And on election day, leaked emails suggested that sorority/fraternity members may have been provided incentives to vote—including free drinks at local bars. As a result of possible voter fraud, Kirby's opponent filed a lawsuit challenging the election results and University of Alabama faculty have questioned whether The Machine has corrupted the democratic process in the City of Tuscaloosa.

=== Greek life ===
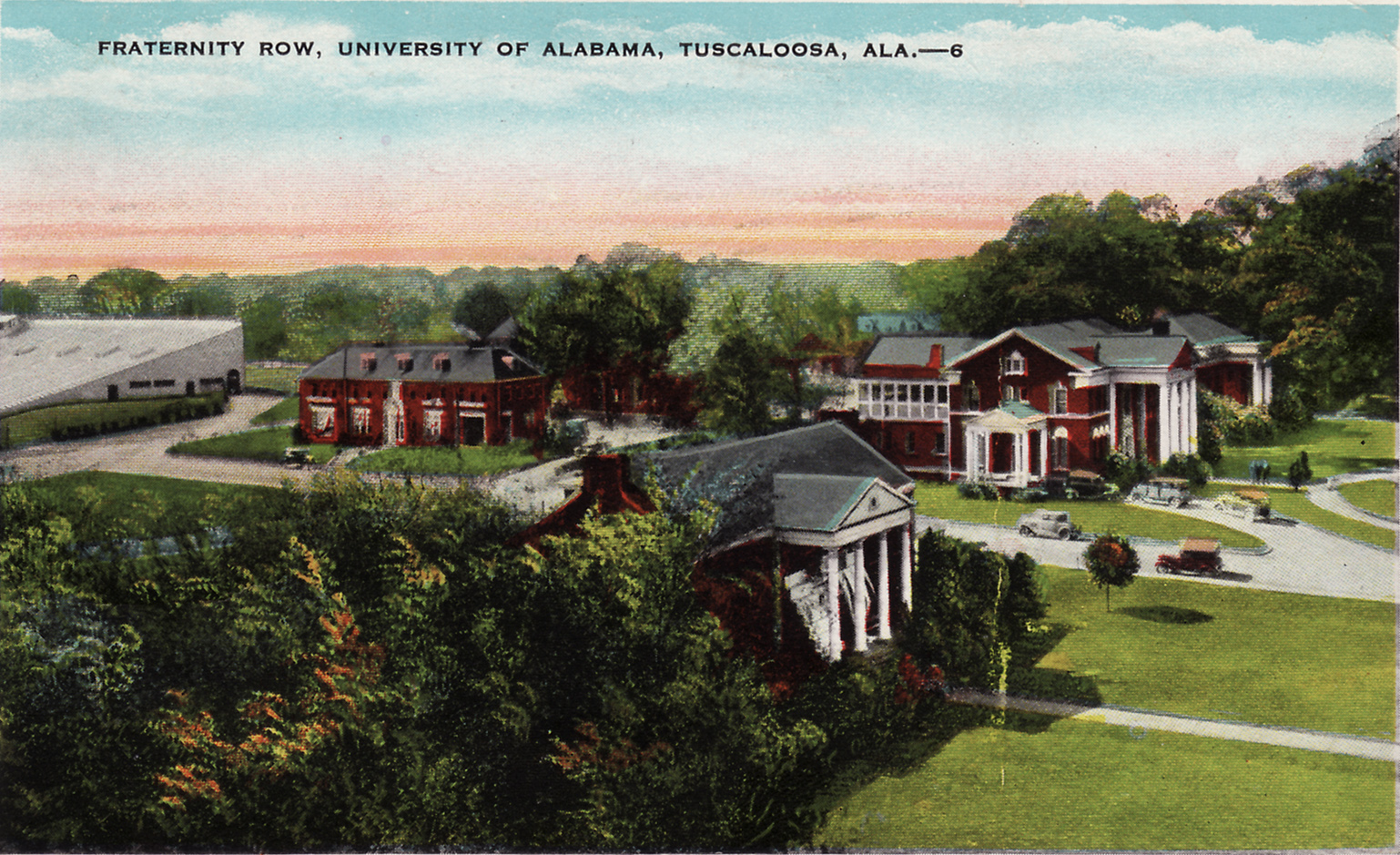
Fraternity Row, c. 1943

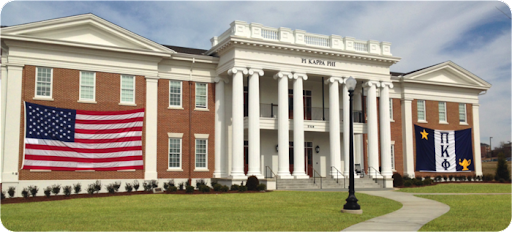
Pi Kappa Phi, Omicron Chapter

UA has one of the largest Greek systems in the nation with over 12,000 active students. In 2023, 29% of male undergraduates were in university-sanctioned fraternities; 44% of female undergraduates were in university-sanctioned sororities.

Greek letter organizations (GLOs) first appeared at the university in 1847 when two men visiting from Yale University installed a chapter of Delta Kappa Epsilon. When DKE members began holding secret meetings in the old state capitol building that year, the administration voiced strong disapproval. Over a few more decades, seven other fraternities appeared at UA: Alpha Delta Phi in 1850, Phi Gamma Delta in 1855, Sigma Alpha Epsilon in 1856 (this was the founding chapter), Kappa Sigma in 1867, Sigma Nu in 1874, Sigma Chi in 1876, and Phi Delta Theta in 1877. Anti-fraternity laws were imposed that year, but were lifted in the 1890s. Women at the university founded the Zeta chapter of Kappa Delta sorority in 1903. Alpha Delta Pi soon followed.

The Atlanta Journal Constitution newspaper reported male students receiving "100 licks with a paddle" by fellow male students multiple times back in the 1890s. Serious injuries in fraternities are a recurring issue.

Despite having the first non-white student initiated into a historically white Greek organization on campus in 2000, notable segregation within Alabama's Greek system has been a debated issue due to some other public college Greek systems becoming more integrated. John P. Hermann, a now-retired English professor, tried in the 1990s and 2000s to end what he referred to as "taxpayer-supported segregation". Controversy erupted again in September 2013, when a story in the campus paper, The Crimson White, revealed that alumnae of Greek organizations had prevented a black student from being accepted in an all-white sorority. As a result, the Alabama Panhellenic Association allowed recruitment to continue through continuous open bidding. According to TIME, a deal that would allow black students to join historically white sororities was announced by the university as "the first step toward ending more than a century of systematic segregation in the school's sorority system".

In 1987, the Theta Sigma chapter of Alpha Kappa Alpha became the first historically black Greek organization and only historically black sorority with a house on a Greek row. The Kappa Alpha chapter of Alpha Phi Alpha is the first and only historically black fraternity with a house on fraternity row.

=== Student media ===
The Crimson White is the student-produced newspaper. The CW publishes continuously online and physical copies twice a week on Monday and Thursday during the academic year and weekly in the summer. The CW normally distributes 10,000 copies per publication. The CW won the Mark of Excellence Award for a second time in 2011 and a Gold Crown Award from the Columbia Scholastic Press Association for its spring 2011 issues. The Crimson White was also inducted into the College Media Hall of Fame for its coverage of the April 2011 tornado that caused massive damage in Tuscaloosa. Other UA student publications include the Blount Truth Literary Journal, Marr's Field Journal, and Alice. In December 2025, the university's vice president of student life, Steven Hood, said that two student magazines, Alice, which focused on women's lifestyle, and Nineteen Fifty-Six, which wrote about Black student culture, would be suspended because while facially neutral, their target demographics meant they counted as "unlawful proxies" contrary to federal anti-diversity, equity, and inclusion guidance issued by US Attorney General Pam Bondi.

== Athletics and traditions ==
Alabama logo

The University of Alabama's intercollegiate athletic teams are known as the Alabama Crimson Tide (this name can be shortened to Alabama, the Crimson Tide, or even the Tide). The nickname Crimson Tide originates from a 1907 football game versus Auburn University in Birmingham where, after a hard-fought game in torrential rain in which Auburn had been heavily favored to win, Alabama forced a tie. Writing about the game, one sportswriter described the offensive line as a "Crimson Tide", in reference to their jerseys, stained red from the wet dirt.

Alabama competes in the Southeastern Conference of the NCAA's Division I. Alabama fields men's varsity teams in football, basketball, baseball, golf, cross country, swimming and diving, tennis, and track and field. Women's varsity teams are fielded in basketball, golf, cross country, gymnastics, rowing, soccer, softball, swimming and diving, tennis, track and field, and volleyball. The athletic facilities on campus include Bryant–Denny Stadium, named after legendary football coach Paul "Bear" Bryant and former UA President George Denny, and the 14,619-seat Coleman Coliseum.

Alabama maintains athletic rivalries with Auburn University and the University of Tennessee. The rivalry with Auburn is especially heated as it encompasses all sports. The annual Alabama-Auburn football game is nicknamed the Iron Bowl. While the rivalry with Tennessee is centered around football for the most part, there is no shortage of acrimony, especially given the recent history between then-UT Coach Phillip Fulmer and his relationship to the Tide's most recent NCAA probation. There are also rivalries with Louisiana State University (football and baseball), University of Mississippi (football and men's basketball), Mississippi State University (football, men's basketball), University of Georgia (football, women's gymnastics), and the University of Florida (football, softball).

=== Football ===
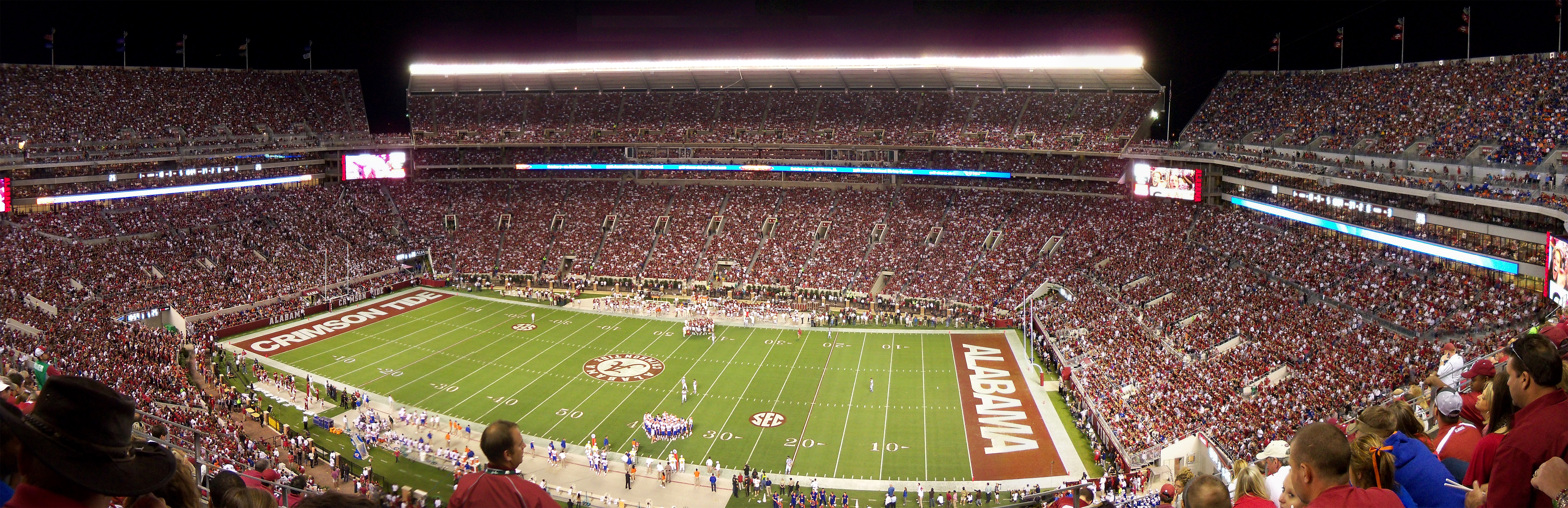
Bryant–Denny Stadium in 2010

The University of Alabama football program, started in 1892, has won 30 SEC titles and 18 national championships (including 12 awarded by the Associated Press and 8 by the Coaches Poll). The program has compiled 36 10-win seasons and 59 bowl appearances, winning 32 of them – all NCAA records. Alabama has produced 18 hall-of-famers, 97 All-Americans honored 105 times, and 4 Heisman trophy winners (Mark Ingram II, Derrick Henry, DeVonta Smith, and Bryce Young).

The Crimson Tide's current home venue, Bryant–Denny Stadium, opened in 1929 with a capacity of around 12,000. The most recent addition of the stadium was completed in 2010. An upper deck was added in the south end zone, completing the upper deck around the stadium. The current official capacity of the stadium is 101,821. The previous addition was the north end zone expansion, completed 2006. The Tide has also played many games, including the Iron Bowl against rival Auburn University, at Legion Field in Birmingham.

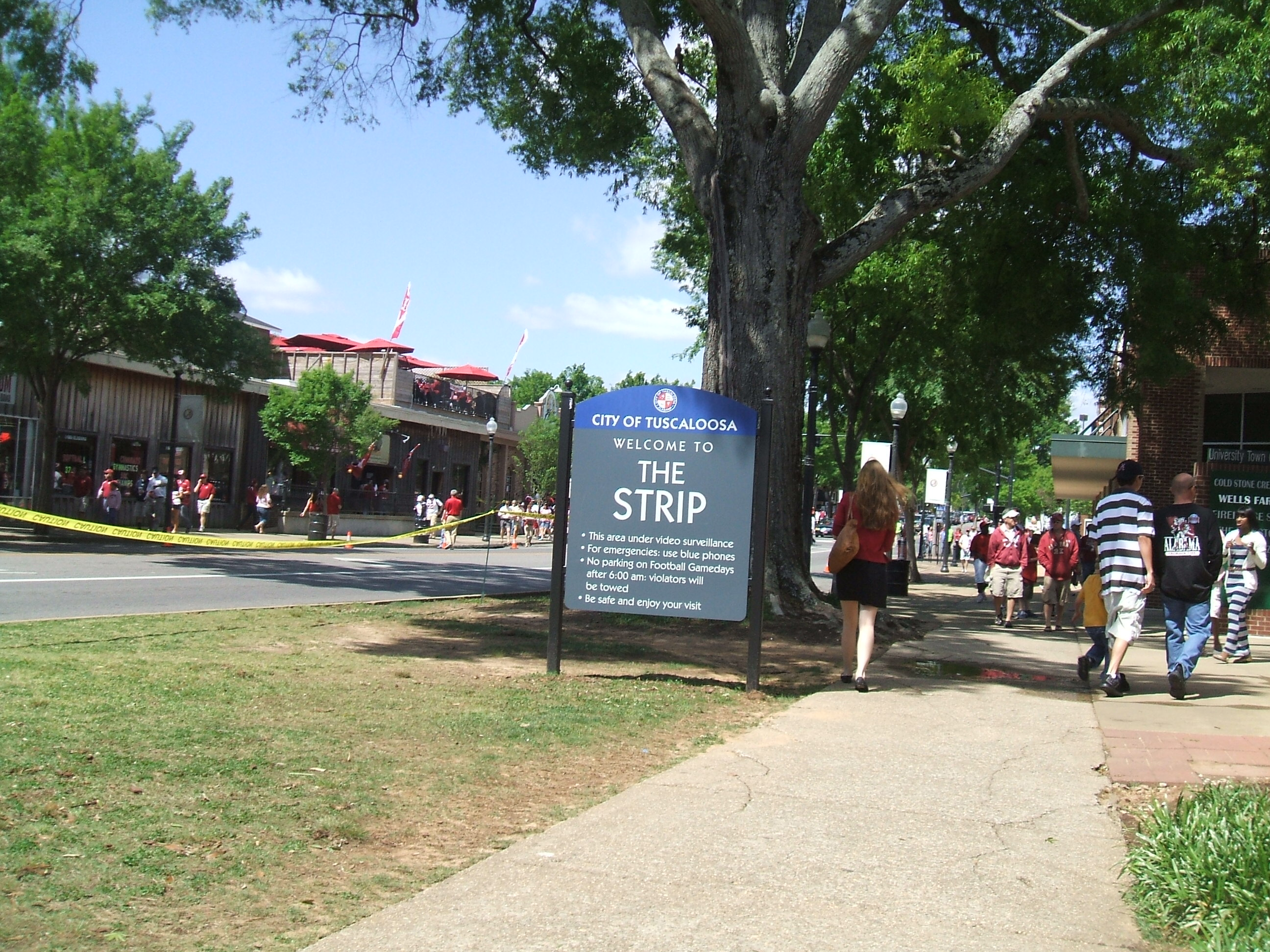
"The Strip" during a home game in 2006. Located adjacent to Bryant-Denny Stadium and the campus

Nearly synonymous with Alabama football is legendary coach Paul "Bear" Bryant whose record at the University of Alabama was 232–46–9. He led the Crimson Tide to 6 national titles in 1961, 1964, 1965, 1973, 1978, and 1979. Alabama's most recent head football coach Nick Saban won a total of 7 national titles, including six at Alabama. Additionally, the 1966 team was the only one in the country to finish with a perfect record, but poll voters denied the 12–0 Alabama team the three-peat as Michigan State and Notre Dame played to a 10–10 tie in what was considered the "Game of the Century" and subsequently split the national championship.

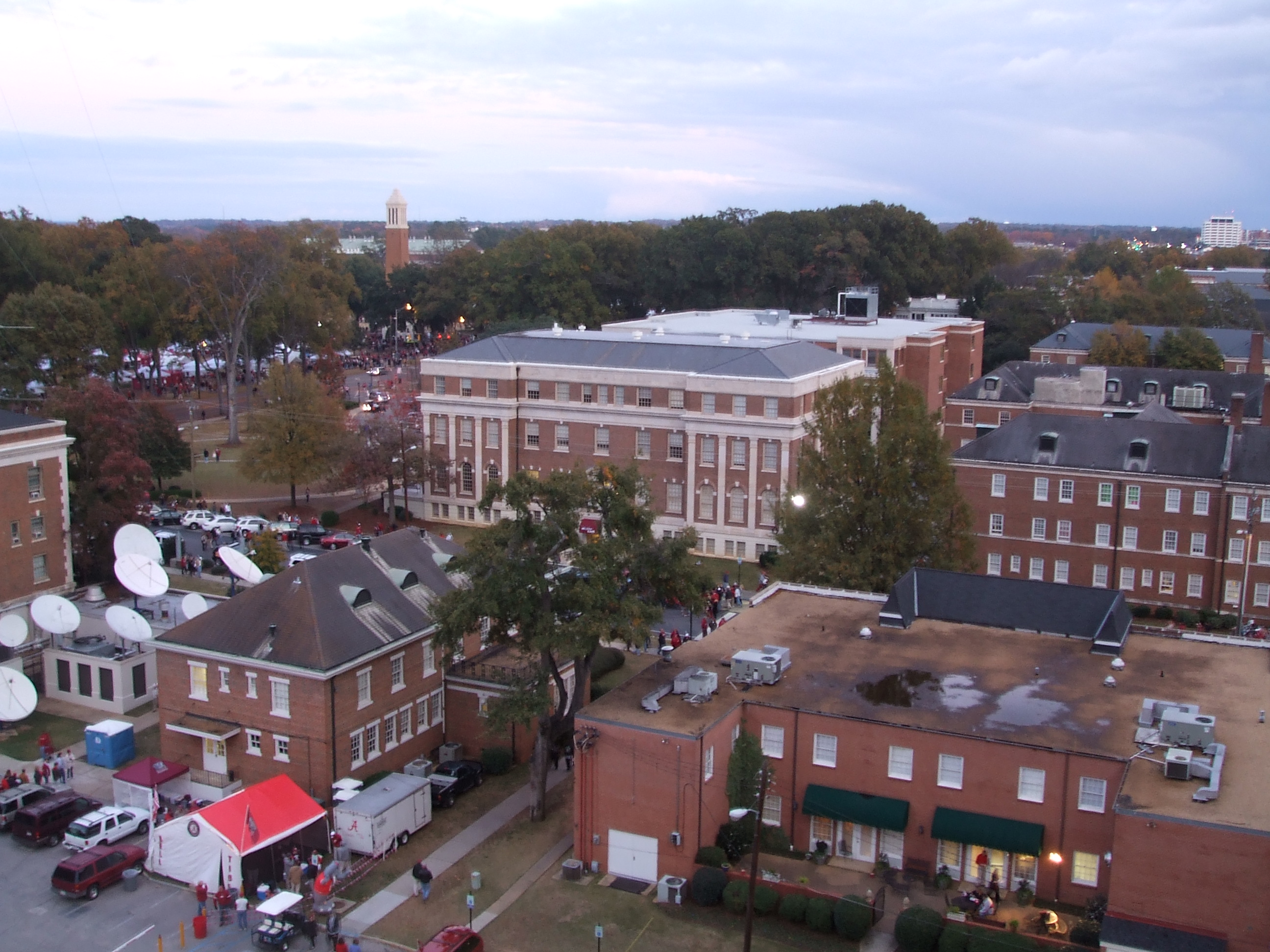
A view of some campus buildings during seasonal tailgating, 2008. Denny Chimes visible in the background

In the 2020 season, Alabama earned a 13–0 record against an all-SEC schedule during the COVID-19 pandemic including winning the SEC Championship against Florida, the Rose Bowl against Notre Dame, and the National Championship game against Ohio State. Crimson Tide Wide Receiver DeVonta Smith was awarded the Heisman Trophy, the program's third winner. In the 2021 season, the Crimson Tide would post a 13–2 record, including a 41–24 win over Georgia in the SEC championship game to win their 29th conference title. They would then go on to beat the Cincinnati Bearcats 27–6 in the Cotton Bowl, culminating in an eventual loss to Georgia in the National Championship by a score of 33–18. Along with a successful football season, Alabama's starting quarterback, Bryce Young, won the Heisman trophy - becoming the fourth player from the university to win it, and the first quarterback from the university to win it.

=== School songs ===
The school's fight song is "Yea Alabama", written in 1926 by Lundy Sykes, then editor of the campus newspaper. Sykes composed the song in response to a contest by the Rammer Jammer to create a fight song following Alabama's first Rose Bowl victory. The song as it is played by the Million Dollar Band during games and known to most people is simply the chorus of the larger song. The Alabama Alma Mater is set to the tune of Annie Lisle, a ballad written in the 1850s.

== Alumni ==
University of Alabama graduates include 15 Rhodes Scholars, 59 Goldwater Scholars, and 16 Truman Scholars. UA graduates have also been named to the USA Today All-USA College Academic Team.

Among UA's alumni are Mel Allen, Hugo Black, Bear Bryant, Kaitlan Collins, Julio Jones, Harper Lee, Jim Nabors, Joe Namath, Joe Scarborough, Jeff Sessions, Richard Shelby, Justin Thomas, Jimmy Wales, and George Wallace.

Notable University of Alabama alumni include:

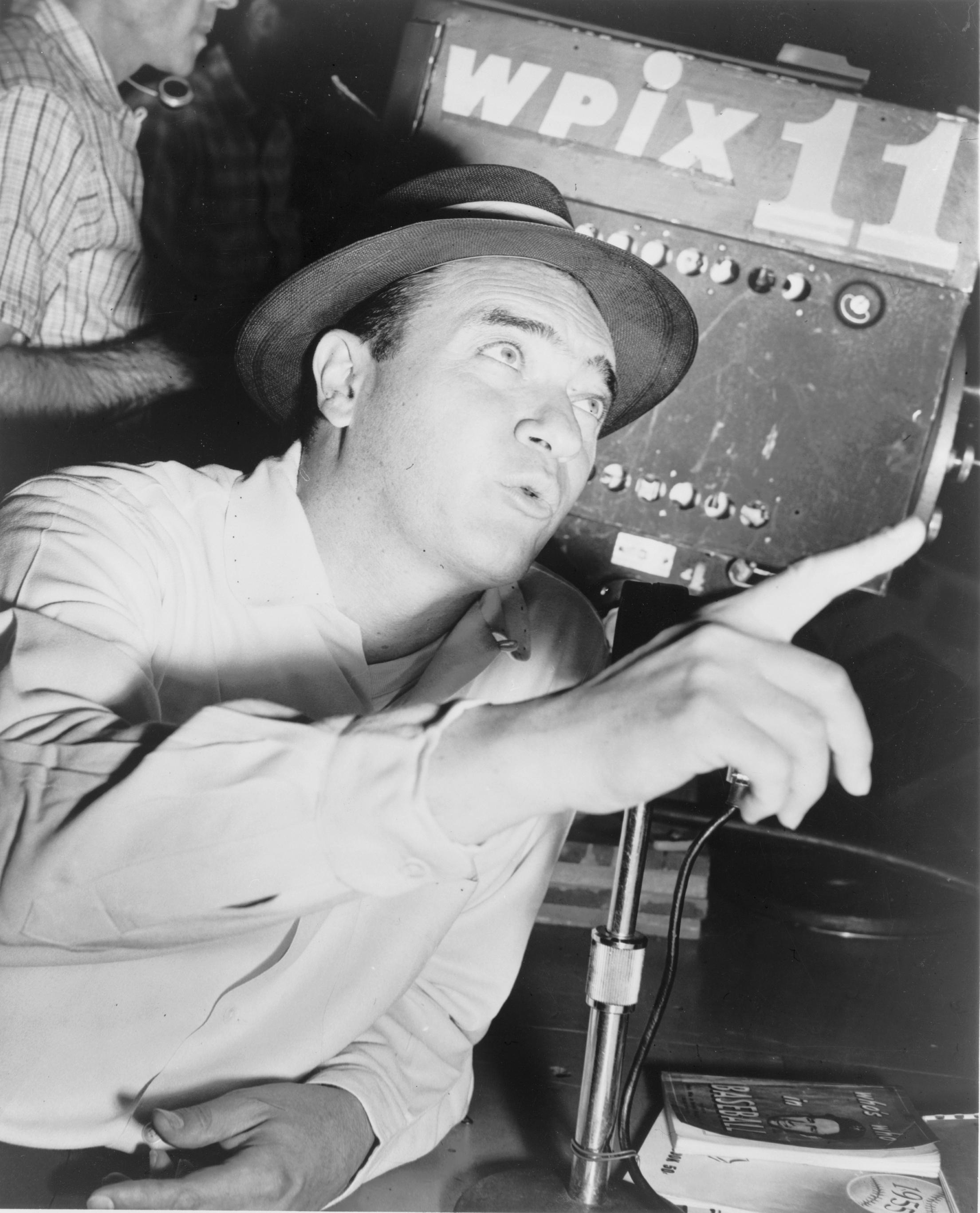
Sportscaster Mel Allen

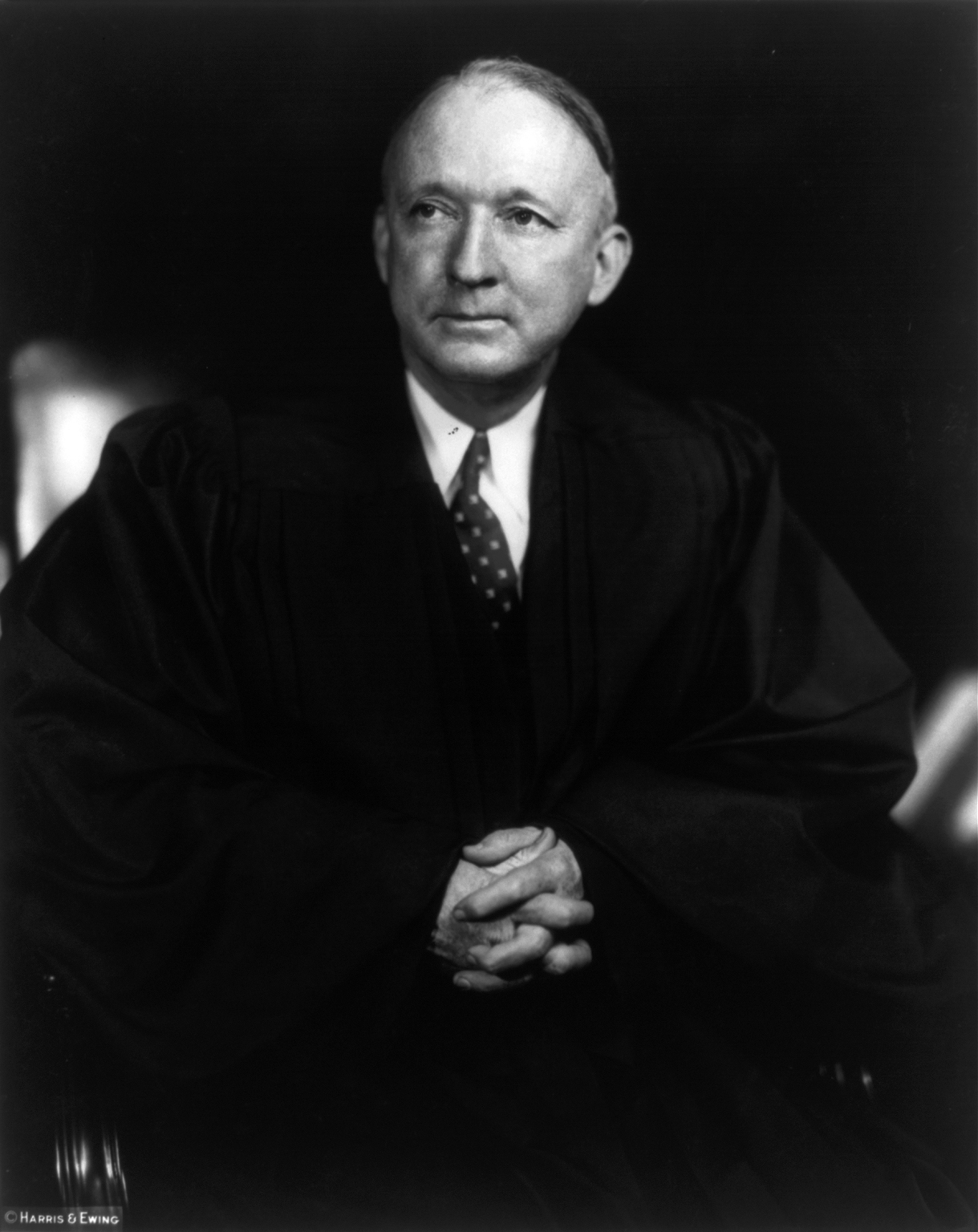
Associate justice of the U.S. Supreme Court Hugo Black

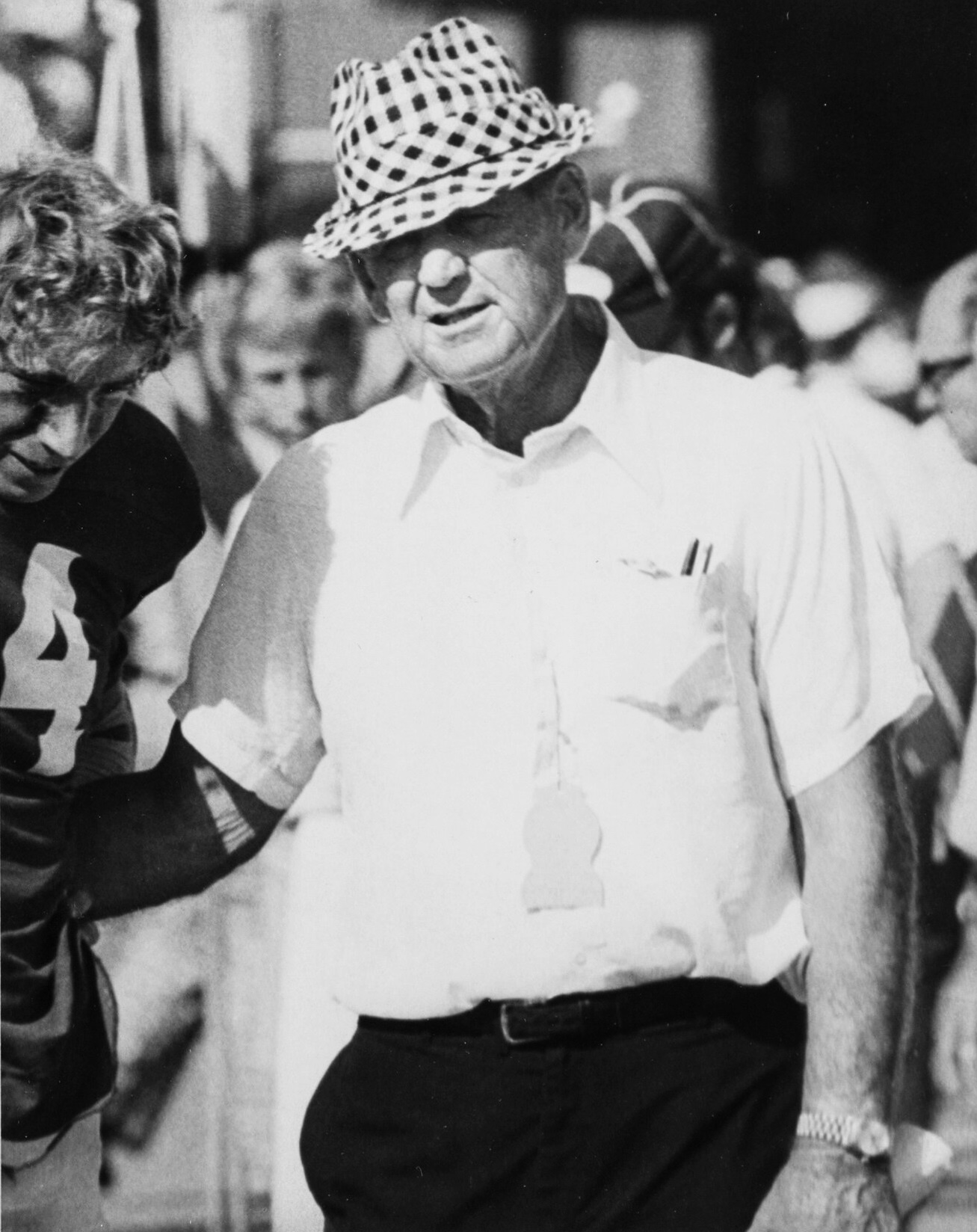
Football coach Bear Bryant

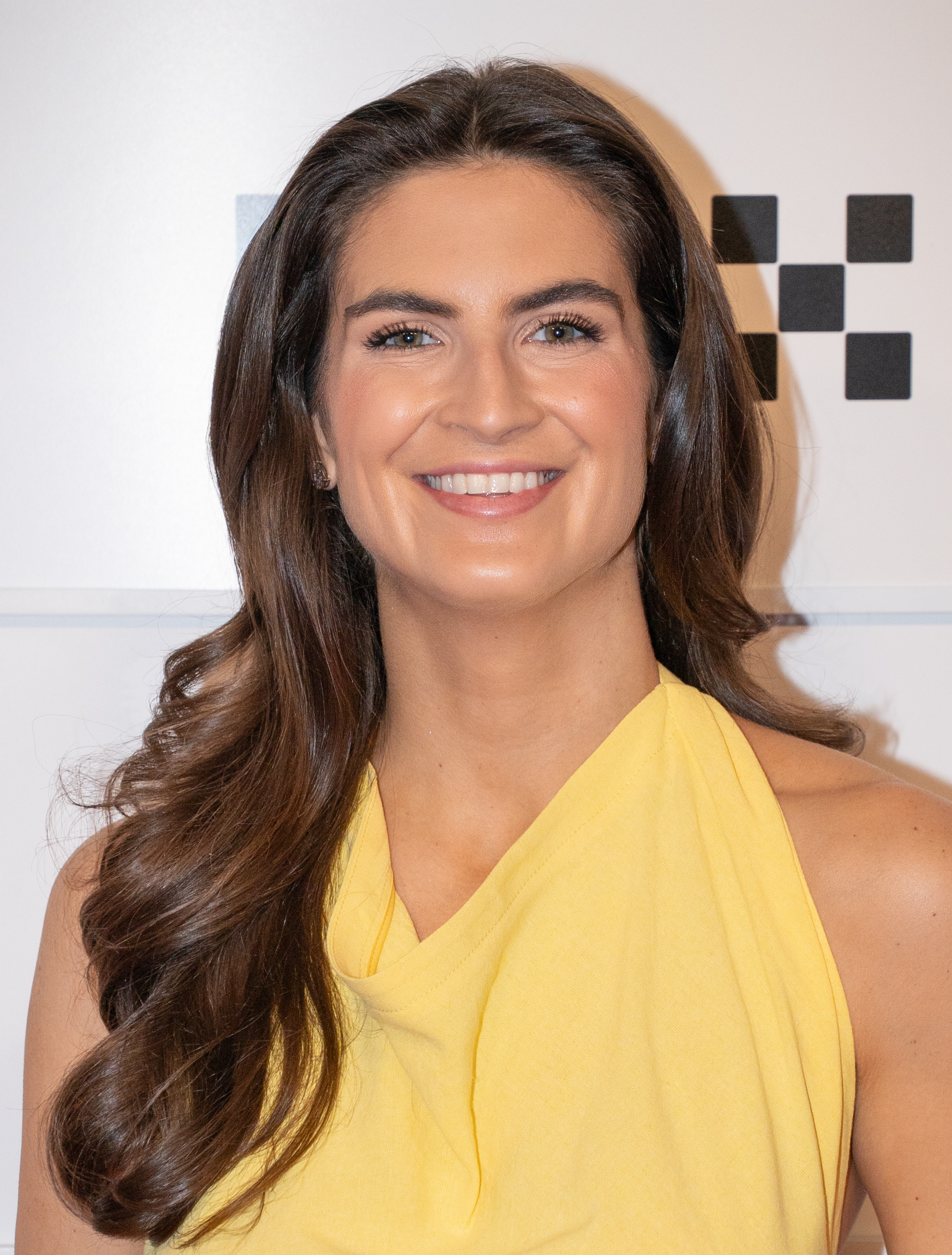
Journalist Kaitlan Collins

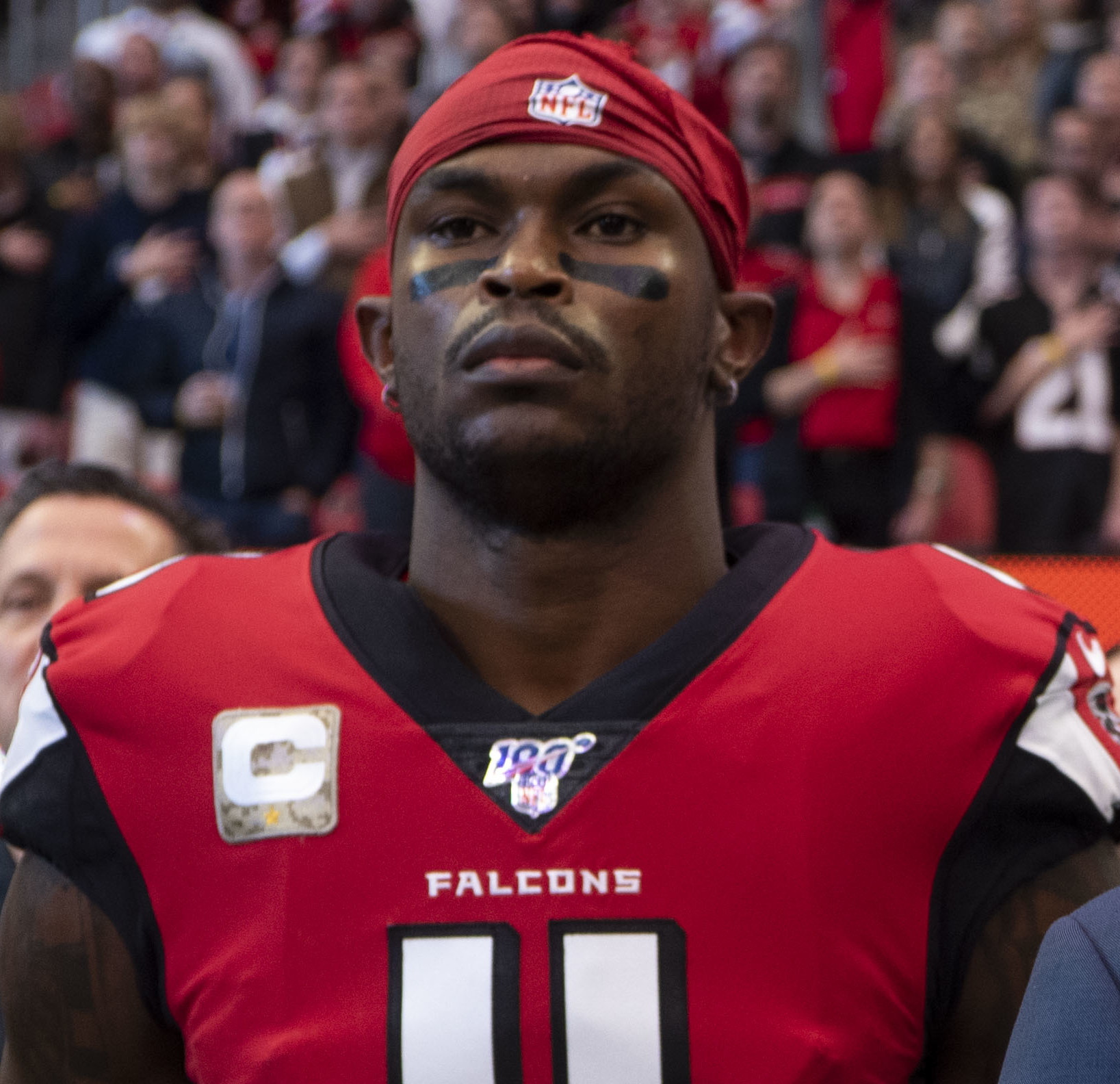
Football player Julio Jones

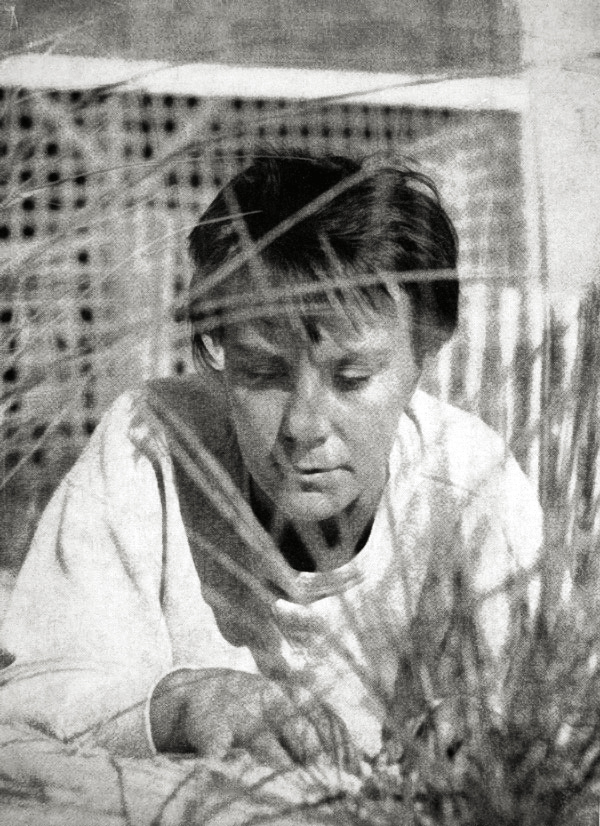
Author Harper Lee

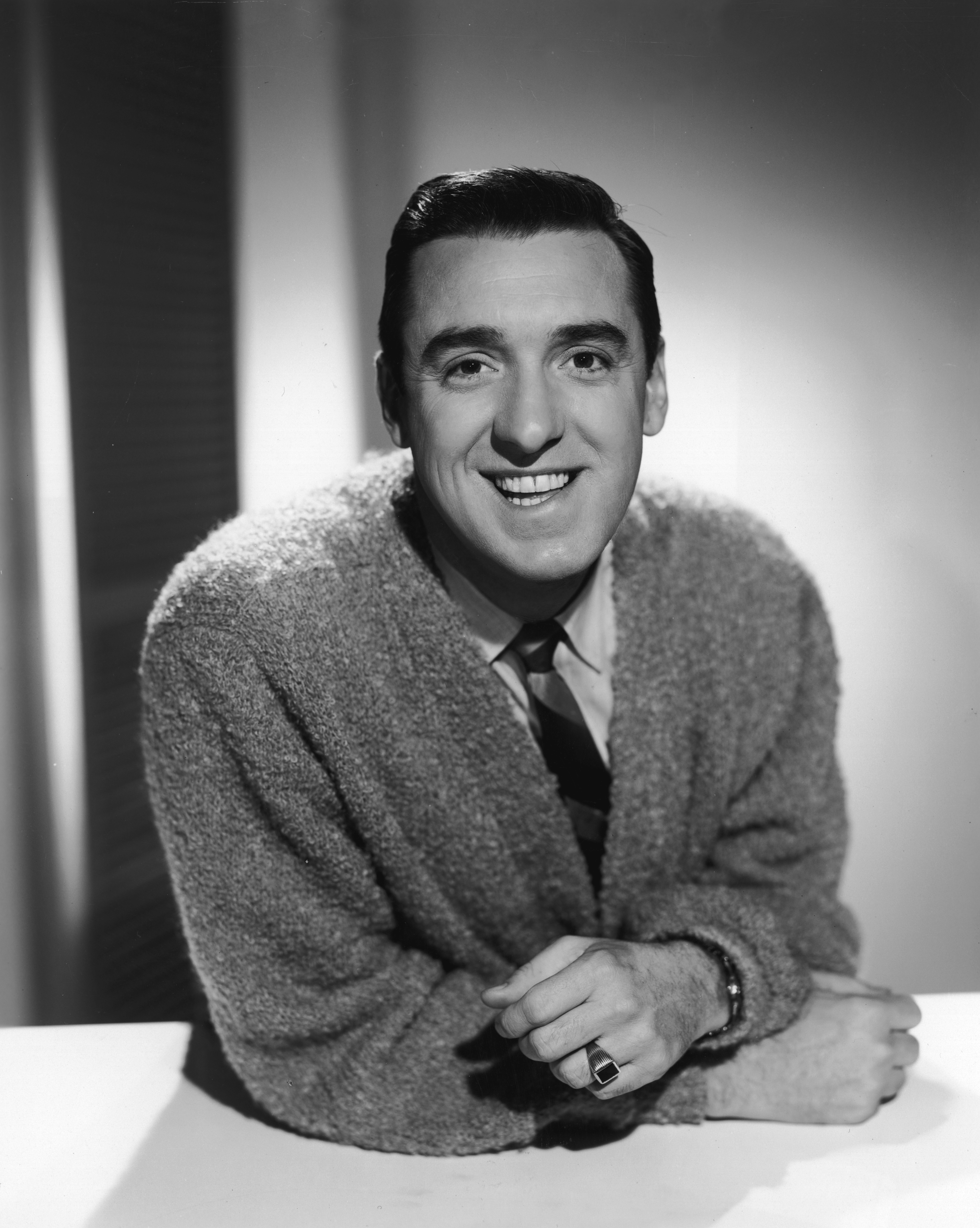
Actor, singer, and comedian Jim Nabors

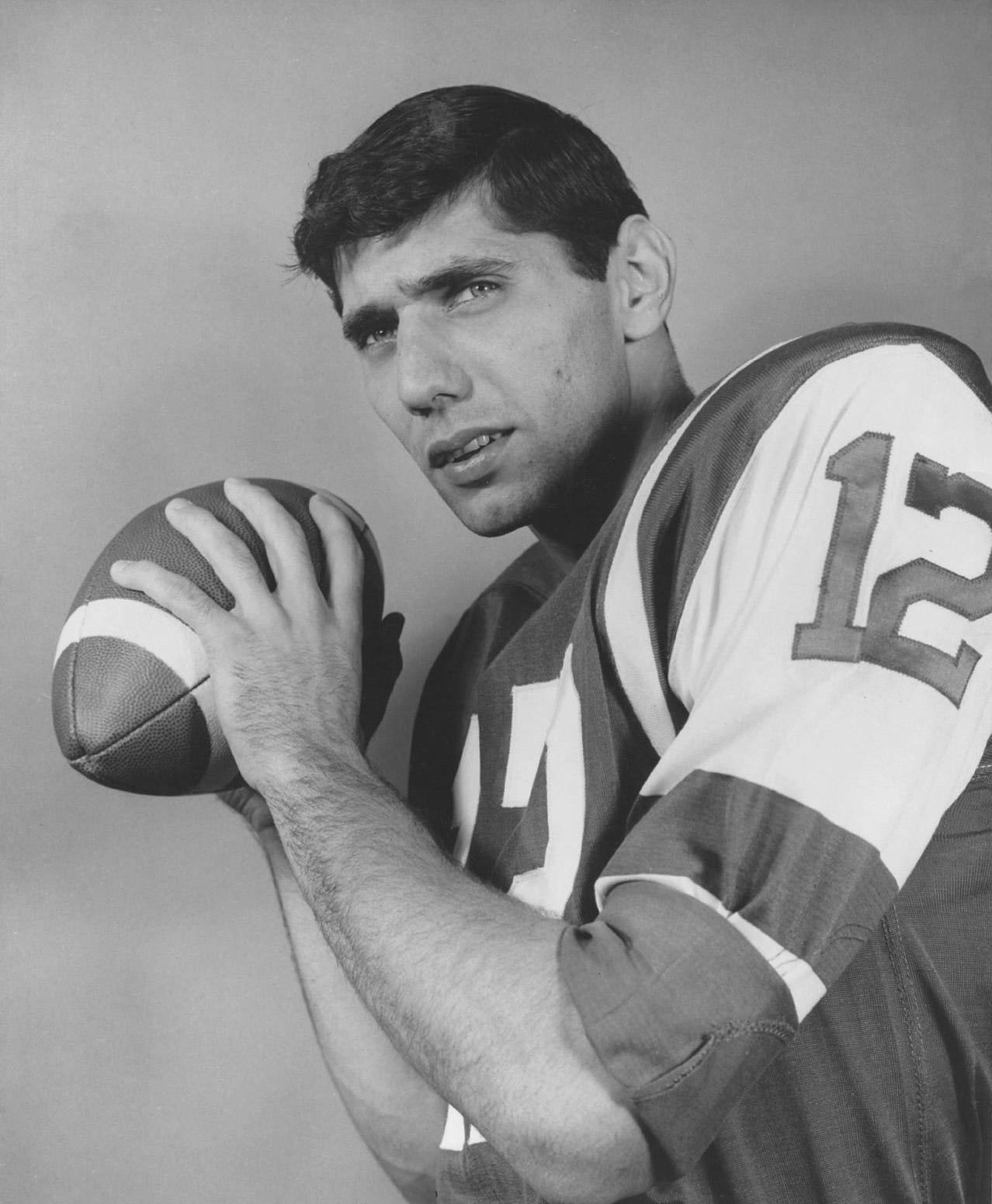
Football player Joe Namath

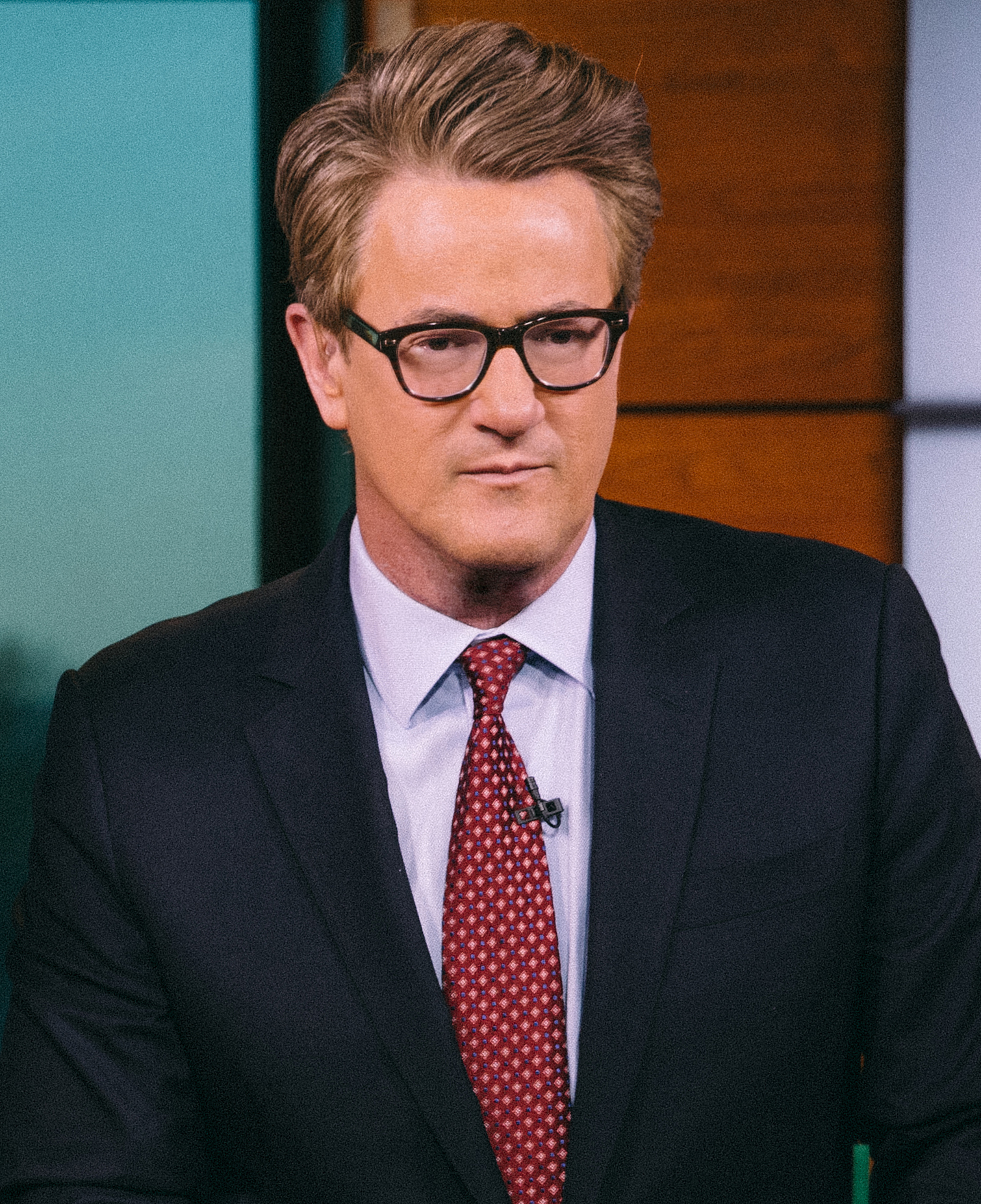
Television host Joe Scarborough

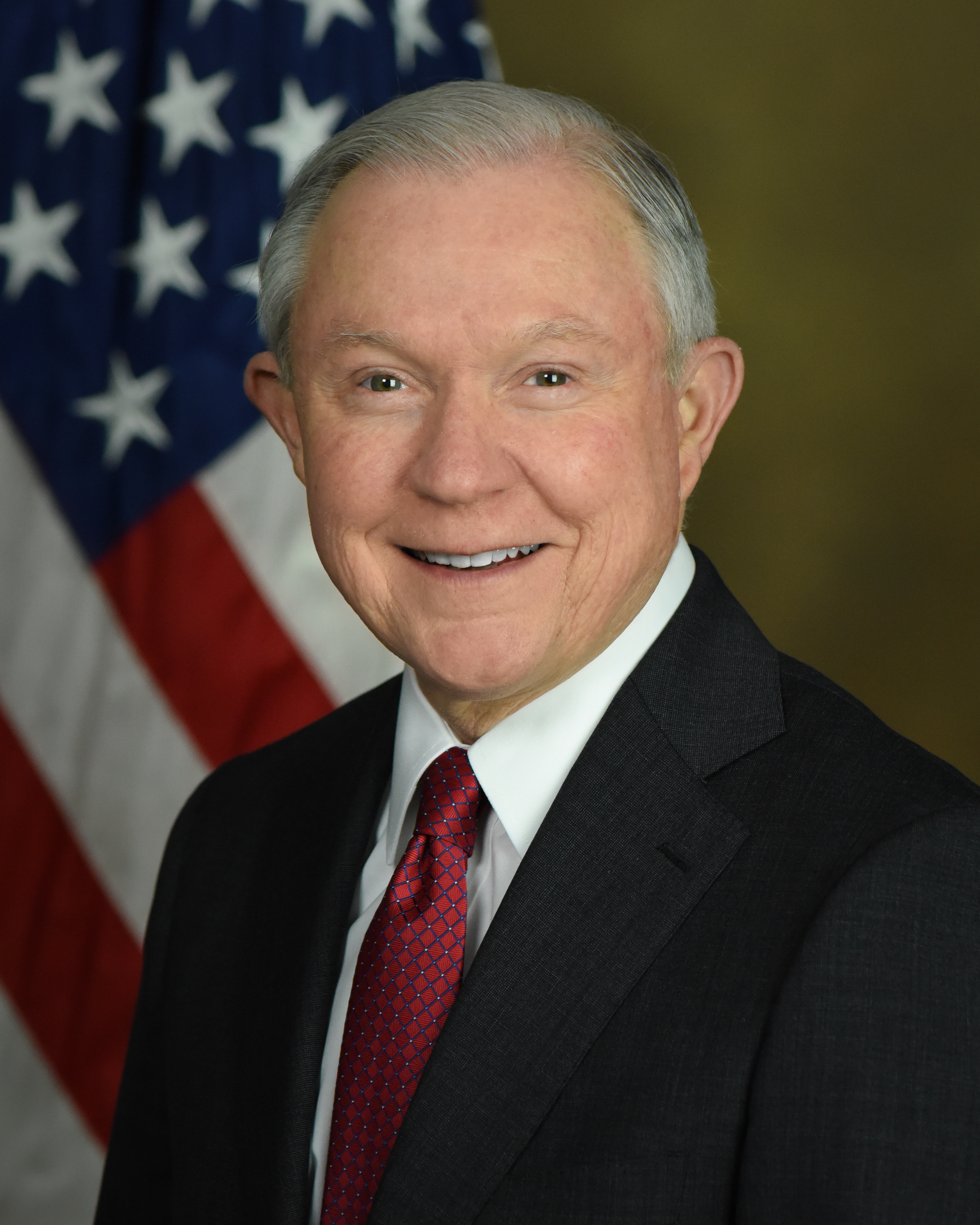
U.S. Senator Jeff Sessions

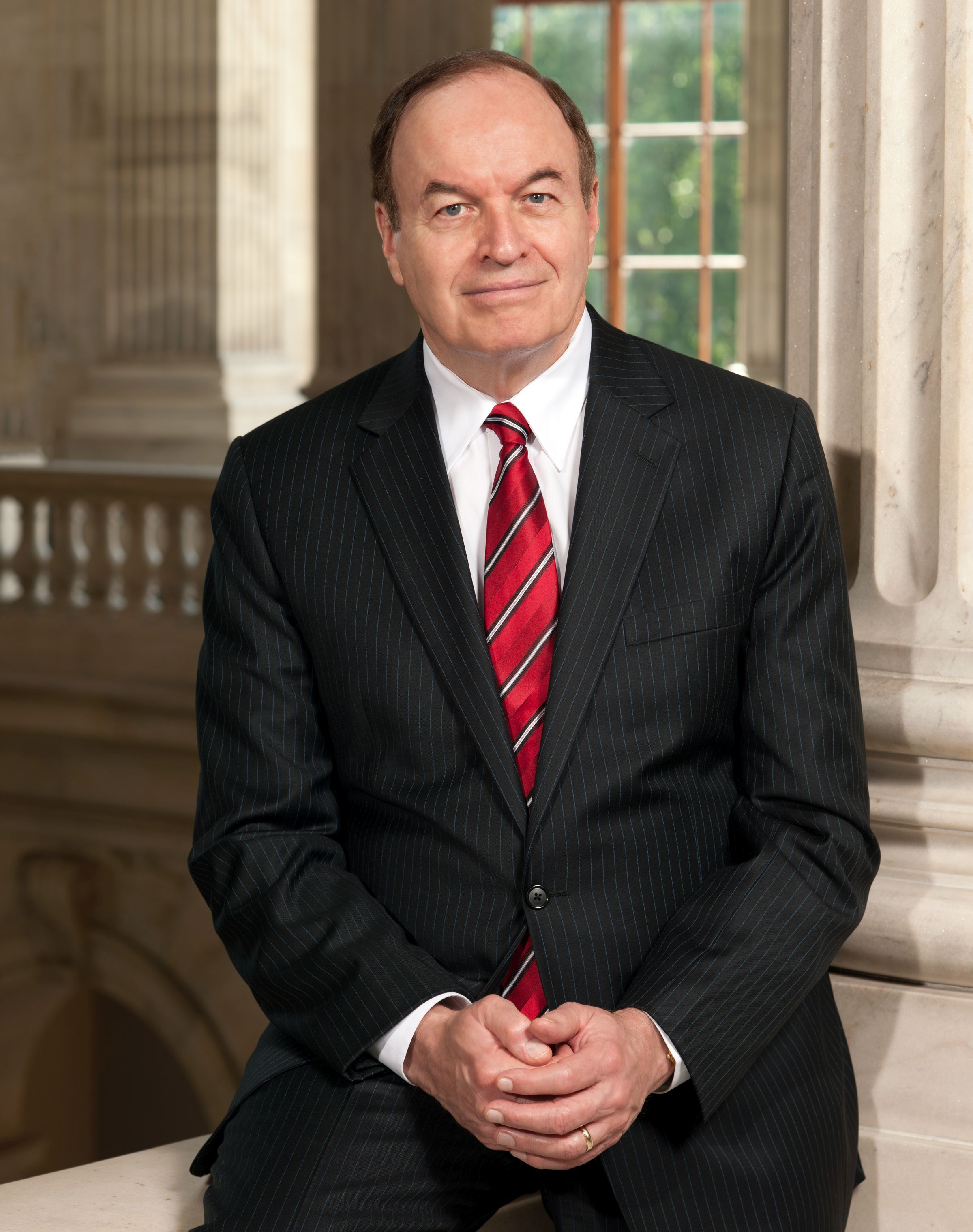
U.S. Senator Richard Shelby

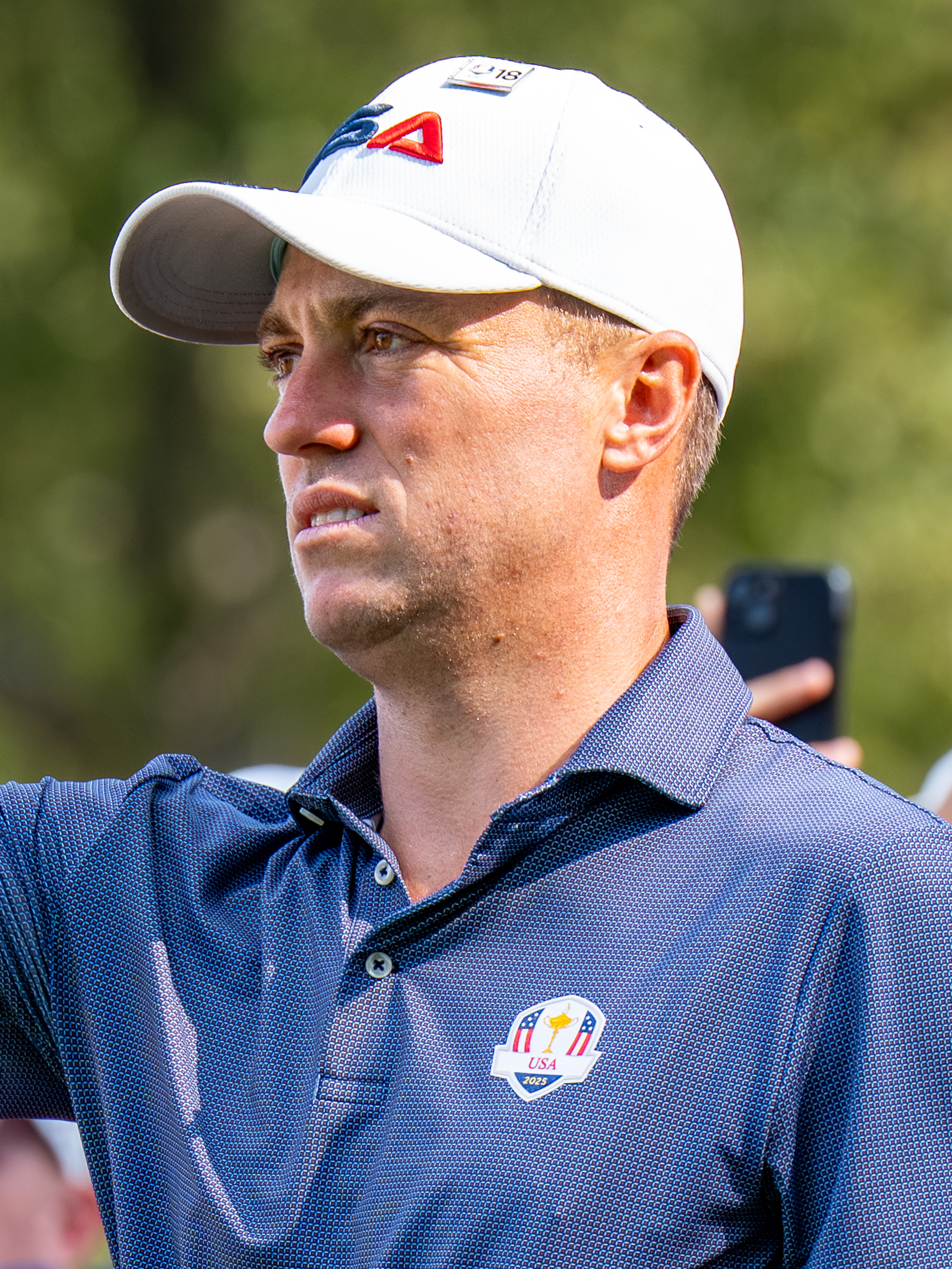
PGA Tour player Justin Thomas

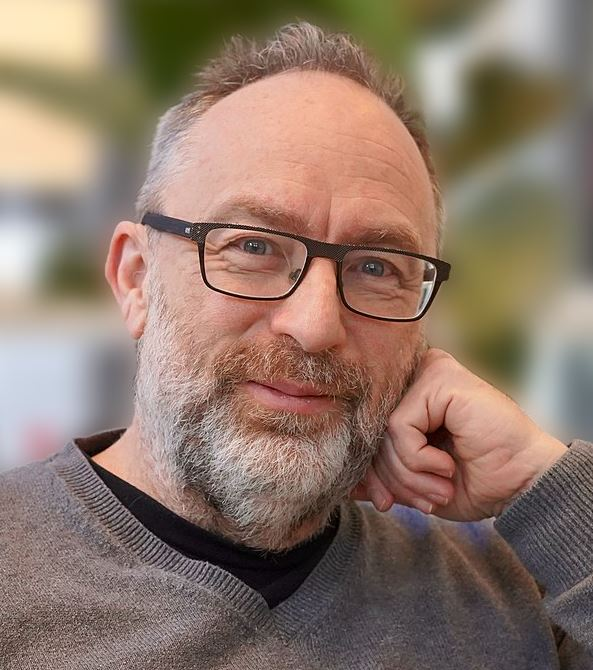
Co-founder of Wikipedia Jimmy Wales

Governor of Alabama George Wallace
