= Culverhouse College of Business =

University of Alabama's Business School

Coordinates: 33.2119°N 87.5490°W

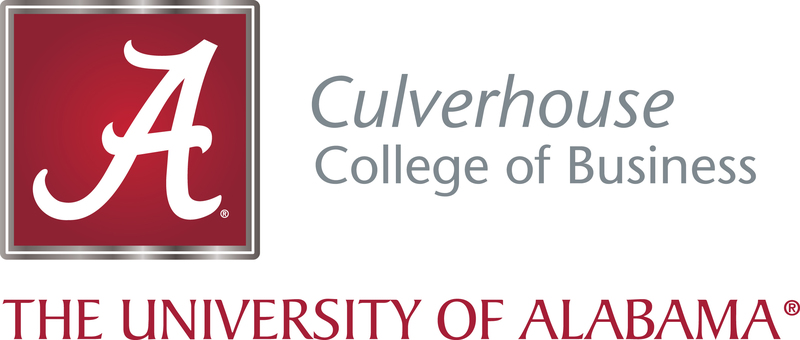
- Motto: Bama Means Business
- Type: Public business school
- Established: 1919
- Parent institution: University of Alabama
- Accreditation: AACSB
- Dean: Dr. Kay M. Palan
- Students: 10,005 (fall 2023)
- Undergraduates: 9,290 (fall 2022)
- Postgraduates: 682 (fall 2022)
- Location: Tuscaloosa, Alabama, U.S.
- Alumni: 60,000
- Website: culverhouse.ua.edu

The Culverhouse College of Business is the business school at the University of Alabama in Tuscaloosa, Alabama, United States.

Established in 1919 as the School of Commerce and Business Administration, the college offers bachelor's, master's, and doctorate degrees. The college's graduate unit is the Manderson Graduate School of Business.

== History ==
The Culverhouse College of Business was launched in 1919 as the School of Commerce and Business Administration by Lee Bidgood, the first dean of the school. The college underwent various transformations over the years, including the launch of the graduate program in 1924. The School of Commerce and Business Administration became a college in 1969 and renamed the College of Commerce and Business Administration. It was renamed Culverhouse College of Business in 2018 in honor of Hugh Francis Culverhouse Sr. and his wife, Elsie Culverhouse, whose significant philanthropic contributions played an important role in the college's growth.

== Rankings ==
=== Culverhouse College of Business ===
- 2027 U.S. News & World Report Business School Ranking:
  - Overall Ranking: 50th
  - Ranking Among Public Schools: 29th
- 2023-2024 U.S. News & World Report Best Online Bachelor's Ranking:
  - Ranking Among Public Schools: 6th

=== Manderson Graduate School of Business ===
The graduate unit of the Culverhouse College of Business, the Manderson Graduate School of Business offers a range of graduate programs with concentrations available in areas such as finance, marketing, and operations management.

Rankings specific to the Manderson Graduate School include:

- 2026 U.S. News & World Report MBA Program Ranking:
  - Overall Ranking: 53th
  - Ranking Among Public Schools: 27th
- 2025-2026 Poet & Quants MBA Program Ranking:
  - Overall Ranking: 66th
- 2025-2026 U.S. News & World Report Best Online Master's Ranking:
  - Overall Ranking: 30th

== Academic programs ==
The college has been accredited by AACSB continuously since 1929. Undergraduate programs encompass fields such as accounting, finance, management, marketing, and economics. The graduate level includes the Manderson MBA program, specialized master's degrees, and doctoral programs.

== Centers and initiatives ==
The college is home to several research centers and initiatives that focus on specific business domains. Notable examples include the Center for Business and Economic Research, the Alabama Center for Insurance Information and Research, and initiatives such as the STEM Path to the MBA program.

== Facilities ==
Opened in 2022, the 108,000 square foot Hewson Hall became the center for the business school. Additionally, the college offers resources such as career services, networking events, and internship opportunities.

== Notable alumni ==
- Winton M. Blount: Entrepreneur; Founder and former CEO of Blount International; Former Postmaster General.
- Samuel DiPiazza: Business Executive; Former Chairman of Warner Bros. Discovery; Former CEO of PricewaterhouseCoopers.
- James M. Fail: Financial Executive; Former Chairman of Stone Holdings and Bluebonnet Savings Bank.
- Janet Gurwitch: Entrepreneur; Founder of Gurwitch Products, manufacturer of Laura Mercier Cosmetics.
- Marillyn Hewson: Businesswoman; Former Chairman, President, and CEO of Lockheed Martin.
- Bernie Madoff: Financier and Convicted Fraudster; Attended UA for freshman year.
- Benjamin C. Russell: Entrepreneur; Creator of the sweatshirt; Former President of Russell Manufacturing Co.
- Lowell C. Smith: Academic Administrator; Former President of Nichols College
