= SBA 504 Loan =

Type of small business loan

The U.S. Small Business Administration's SBA 504 Loan or Certified Development Company program is designed to provide financing for the purchase of fixed assets, which usually means real estate, buildings and machinery, at below market rates. The program is so named because it was originally created by Section 504 of the Small Business Investment Act of 1958. Section 504 was subsequently codified at 15 U.S.C. § 697a.

As part of its mission to promote the development of businesses, the SBA offers a number of different loan programs tailored to specific capital needs of growing businesses. The 504 program works by distributing the loan among three parties. The business owner puts a minimum of 10%, a conventional lender (typically a bank) puts up 50%, and a so-called Certified Development Company (CDC) puts up the remaining 40%. Certified Development Companies are established under the SBA 504 program as non-profit corporations set up to support economic growth in their local areas. There are a few hundred such CDCs nationwide. The maximum amount of the loan is $5 million ($5 million for meeting SBA-defined policy goals, and $5.5 million for manufacturers and some energy-related policy goals), and if the borrower defaults, the private sector lender is paid off first, reducing the risk to the lender and encouraging loans.

== Eligibility ==
In order to qualify for the program, the borrower must meet the SBA's definition of small business and must plan to use over half (51%) of the property for its own operations within one year of ownership; if the building is to be newly constructed the borrower must use 60% at once and plan to occupy 80%. The borrower may form a real-estate holding company that lease 100% to the operating business, which then subleases surplus space (up to 49%). To qualify for this program, U.S. citizens or permanent residents must hold a majority of the ownership of the operating companies and the holding company. As of 2009, the 504 Loan does not contain any restrictions or ceilings; however, there are three criteria for eligibility:

- The company's average net income cannot surpass $5 million after taxes for the preceding two years.
- The anticipated project size must be greater than the personal, non-retirement, unencumbered liquid assets of the guarantors/principals.
- Does not have a tangible net worth in excess of $15 million.

== Structure ==
There are three partners in an SBA 504 loan—the borrower, a bank or other regulated lender, and a CDC. Typically the borrower must contribute 10% of the total project cost; their bank lends 50% at their own rate and term (as long as the term is at least 10 years), and has a first lien on the assets being financed; and the CDC lends 40%, with a second lien. If the financing is for real estate, as most 504 loans are, the CDC's loan is for twenty years at a fixed rate of interest. The fully amortized rate for loans funding in August 2010 was 4.931% (the number changes based on the rate for current 5-year and 10-year U.S. Treasury issues). The funds for these loans are raised through a monthly auction of debentures that are 100% guaranteed by the U.S. Government. If the financing is for long-lasting fixed equipment such as printing presses, commercial laundry equipment, manufacturing equipment, etc., the 504 loan term is 10 years.

If the borrower's company has less than two consecutive years of operating history or if the building or assets to be financed are considered "special purpose" (e.g., gas stations or some medical clinics), the borrower must increase their contribution by 5% for a total of 15%, and the CDC lends 5% less for a total of 35%-- in cases where the borrowers meet both of these conditions, they must increase to 20%, and the CDC lends 30%.

Total project costs can include the costs for land and existing building or equipment; hard construction/renovation; fixtures and equipment; certain furniture; professional fees including appraisals and environmental investigations; soft costs; and closing costs. Project costs can usually be financed in their entirety with a 504 loan, whereas most commercial bank loans only finance a percentage of the purchase price/appraised value and borrowers would have to come up with closing and soft costs out of pocket. If borrowers later decide to sell their property, 504 loans are assumable.
