= Gorgas =

Gorgas may refer to

- Edgar Gorgas (1928–2019), German boxer
- Josiah Gorgas (1818–1883), Confederate General and later President of the University of Alabama
  - Gorgas machine gun
- Amelia Gayle Gorgas (1826–1913), librarian and postmistress of the University of Alabama; wife of Josiah
- William C. Gorgas (1854–1920), United States Army officer and physician known for fighting tropical disease; son of Josiah and Amelia
  - Gorgas Hospital, a hospital in Panama named after William C. Gorgas
  - Gorgas Medal
  - Gorgas Science Foundation
  - USS General W. C. Gorgas (ID-1365), a United States Navy troop transport commissioned in 1919, later a U.S. Army ship designated as USAT General W. C. Gorgas
  - Gorgas, Alabama, a settlement in the United States
  - Gorgas–Manly Historic District on the campus of the University of Alabama, U.S.

== See also ==
- Gorgias (disambiguation)
