= University of Alabama Quad =

University quadrangle

Coordinates: 33°12′39″N 87°32′46″W

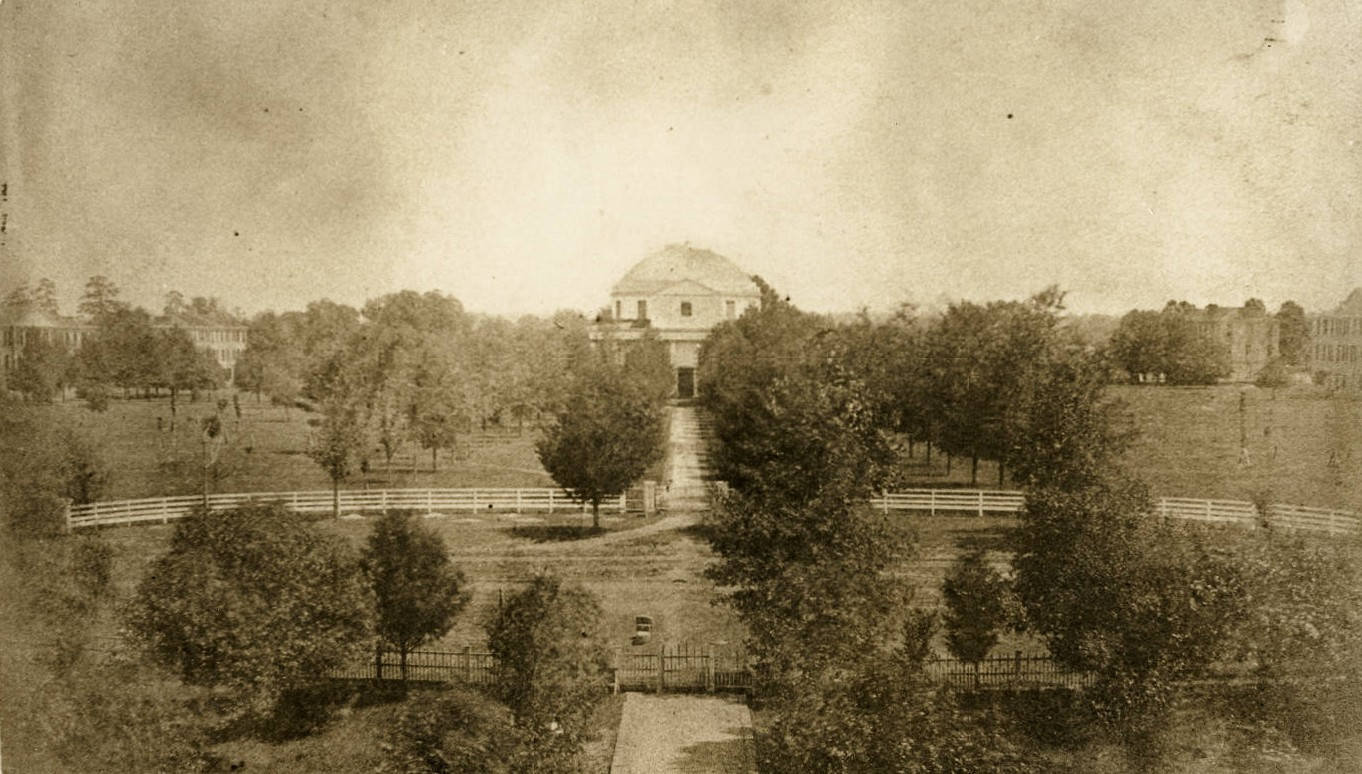
View of the Quad in 1859. The Rotunda can be seen at center, with the halls visible in the background. All of these buildings were destroyed on April 4, 1865.

The Quad is an approximately 22-acre (8.9 ha) quadrangle on the campus of the University of Alabama located in Tuscaloosa, Alabama. Home to most of the university's original buildings, this portion of the campus remains the geographic and historic center of the modern campus. Originally designed by architect William Nichols, construction of the university campus began in 1828, following the move of the Alabama state capital from Cahaba to Tuscaloosa in 1826. The overall design for this early version of the campus was patterned after Thomas Jefferson's plan for the University of Virginia, with its Lawn and Rotunda. Following the destruction of the campus during the American Civil War, a new Quad emerged in the late 19th and early 20th centuries. Different in form and function from the original design of the early 19th century, the modern Quad continues to fill its role as the heart of the campus. Although surrounded by academic and administrative buildings, only five structures are built directly on the Quad: the Little Round House, Tuomey Hall, Oliver-Barnard Hall, Amelia Gayle Gorgas Library, and Denny Chimes. The remainder of the space is occupied by a grove of trees on the west side and a great lawn on the east. A feature on the northwestern side, known as The Mound, is the site of the old Franklin Hall. A popular gathering place, the Quad is home to pep rallies, a bonfire during homecoming, and numerous day-to-day student activities.

== Old Quad ==
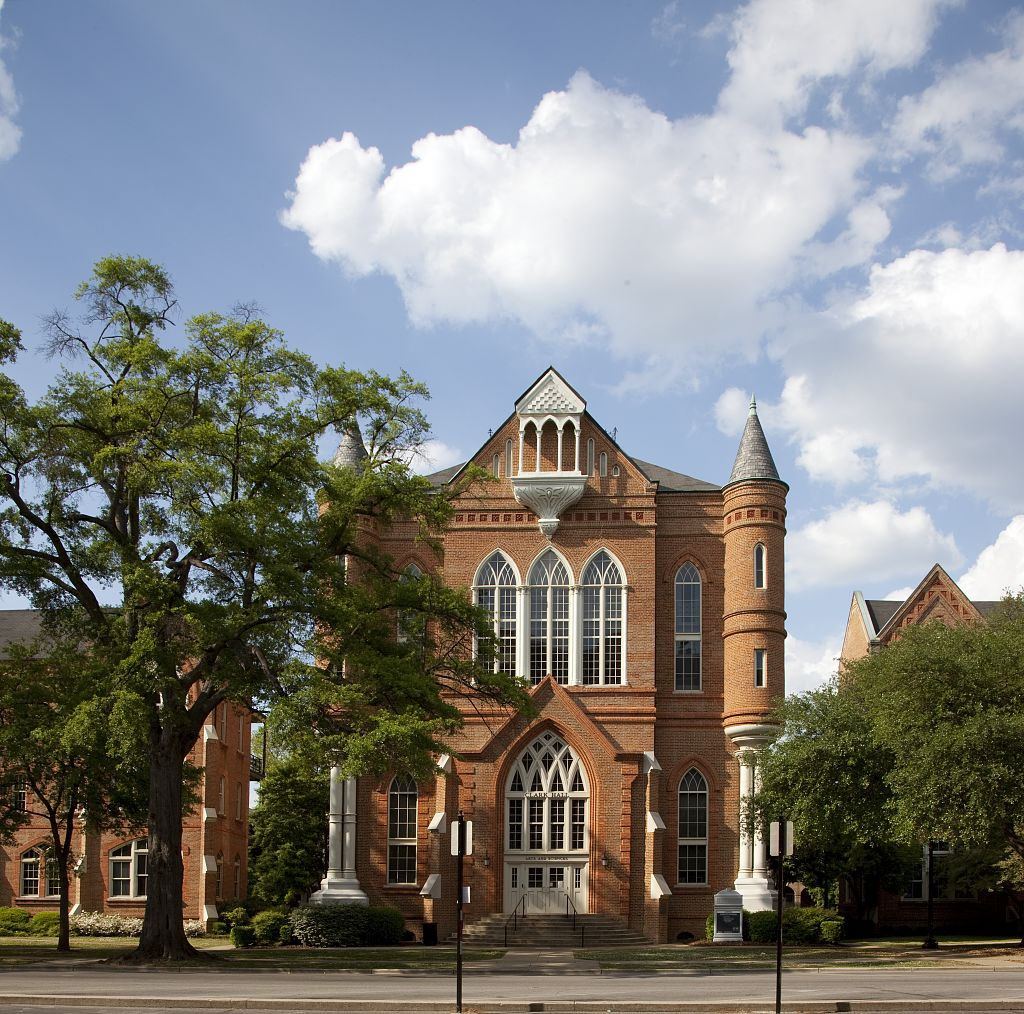
Clark Hall, one of the first new buildings following the Civil War. It was built on the ruins of the old Lyceum.

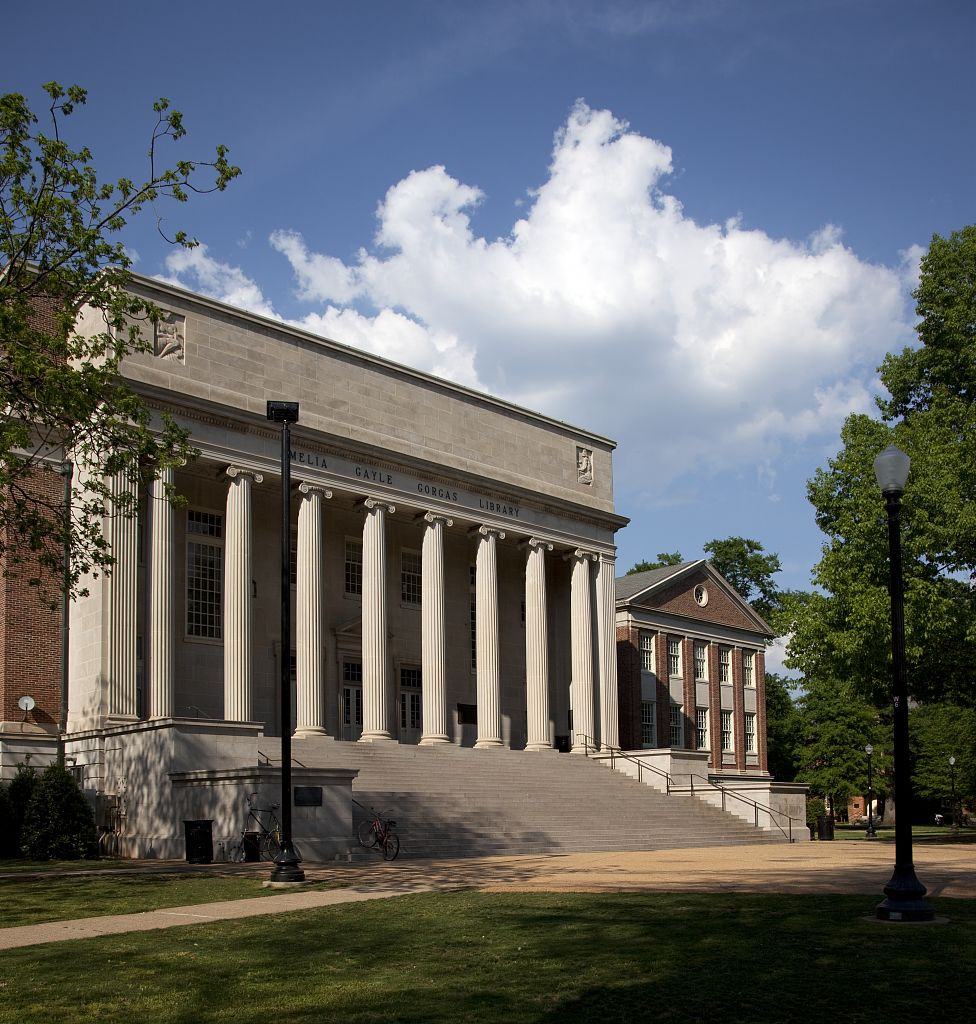
The Amelia Gayle Gorgas Library, built on the site of the old Rotunda.

The Old Quad was rectangular and designed along a north–south axis. By the time of the university's destruction in 1865, the quadrangle featured the Lyceum at the center of the northern side, the 70-foot (21 m) wide, 70-foot (21 m) high Rotunda at the very center of the quadrangle, and the President's Mansion at the center of the southern side. A primary lane ran from the Lyceum in the north, circled the rotunda, and continued on to the President's Mansion in the south. Lining this lane between the Lyceum and Rotunda were six dormitories, three on each side. Another lane ran east to west in front of the Lyceum. To the west of the Lyceum were at least two faculty houses and the Gorgas House, then used as a dining hall. To the east was a faculty house and, at some distance away from the Quad, the Alabama Corps of Cadets gunpowder magazine.

The Lyceum was a two-story brick building with an Ionic portico, very similar in design to the Lyceum that Nichols built several years later at the University of Mississippi. It housed laboratories and classrooms. The Rotunda, completed in 1833, was a three-story brick structure surmounted by a dome and surrounded by a two-story colonnade of twenty-four Ionic columns. An auditorium, used for ceremonies and church services, occupied its first two floors. The third floor housed the university's 7,000-volume library and natural history collection. Near the northwest side of the Rotunda stood a guardhouse, now known as the Little Round House. It was the only structure on the Quad with a direct military purpose. Four of the dormitories were three-story brick buildings, Washington and Franklin halls on the west side of the Quad and Jefferson and Madison halls on the east. Two one-story frame buildings, Johnson and Lee halls, were built in 1863, one between Washington and Franklin and another between Jefferson and Madison.

The Alabama Legislature converted the university over to the military system on February 23, 1860. This decision proved disastrous, as it turned the school into a military target during the Civil War. During the war the university became known as the "West Point of the Confederacy," sending roughly 200 cadets into the field each year. On April 3, 1865 Union Brigadier General John T. Croxton and 1500 cavalrymen approached Tuscaloosa with orders to destroy all targets of military value in the town. On April 4 Croxton sent Colonel Thomas M. Johnston and two hundred men to burn the university. In the midst of carrying out his orders, university faculty pleaded with Johnston to spare the Rotunda and its library. Johnston sent a message via courier to Croxton, asking if he might spare the building. Croxton replied "My orders leave me no discretion... My orders are to destroy all public buildings." By the time that his men had completed their orders only seven university buildings remained: the Gorgas House, President's Mansion, Observatory (not on the Quad), the Little Round House, and a few faculty residences.

== Modern Quad ==
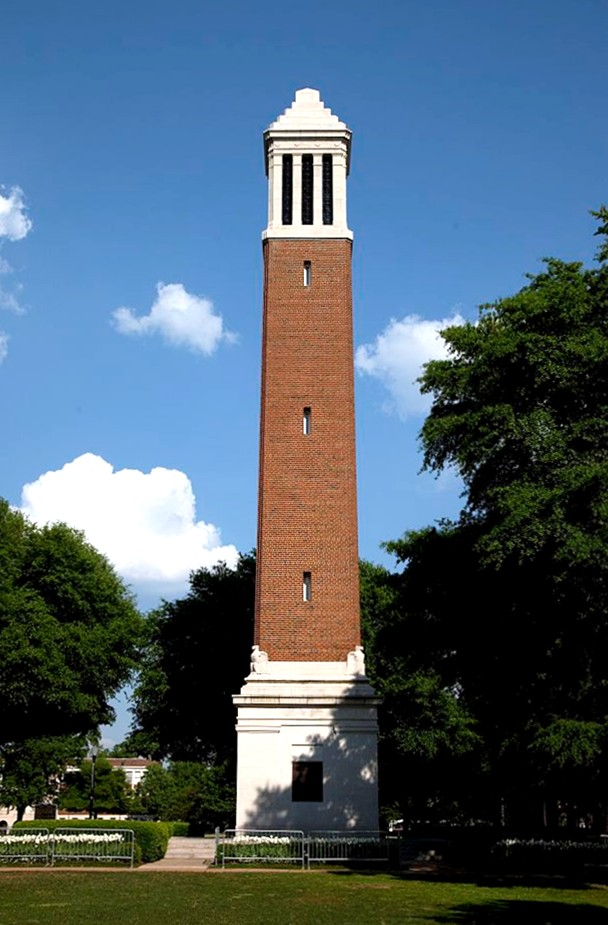
Denny Chimes on the Quad

Following the destruction of the campus, the university remained closed to students until 1871. When it reopened, it had a total enrollment of only 107 students. The first building to be built on the campus was Woods Hall, completed in 1868. It was built well north of the Quad, with bricks from the destroyed Quad buildings. The Quad itself did not become home to any new buildings until the 1880s, following the end of the Reconstruction era. Completed in 1884, Clark Hall was the first new structure facing the Quad. Built on the site of the Lyceum, the Gothic Revival-style building was designed as an all purpose building, with a library, chapel, and a public meeting room. It was followed by two additional Gothic Revival-style buildings, flanking it to the west and east: Manly Hall in 1885 and Garland Hall in 1888. They both were designed as multifunctional structures, with Garland housing the first Alabama Museum of Natural History. Two smaller Gothic Revival-style buildings, Tuomey and Oliver-Barnard halls were completed in 1889, directly on the Quad to the south of the Manly, Clark, and Garland grouping.

The Quad was the first on-campus site for Alabama Crimson Tide football home games. The Tide played there from 1893 to 1914 before moving to Denny Field.

The Quad came to be surrounded by academic buildings during a flurry of building activity in the early 20th century. From 1910 onward, all buildings facing the Quad would be built in the Classical Revival and Beaux-Arts styles. The first of this group was the Beaux-Arts-style Smith Hall, built in 1910 as the new home of the Alabama Museum of Natural History. Next was the Beaux-Arts-style Morgan Hall, built in 1911 as a complement to Smith Hall. It initially housed the School of Law. Little Hall, in Classical-Revival-style, was built in 1915 to house a gymnasium. The adjoining Moore Hall was built in 1935 as an extension of Little and did not receive a name until 1975.

The 1920s saw more building activity around the Quad than any other period since the initial construction of the university. It saw the construction of Nott Hall in 1922, Carmichael Hall in 1925, Lloyd and Farrah halls in 1927, Bidgood Hall in 1928, and Bibb Graves Hall, Doster Hall, and the Alabama Union (present-day Reese Phifer Hall) in 1929. Denny Chimes, a 115-foot (35 m) campanile on the southern end of the Quad was also completed in 1929. The Amelia Gayle Gorgas Library was the last structure built directly on the Quad, on the site of the former Rotunda. The five-floor Classical Revival building was completed in 1939. Some of the foundation ruins of the Rotunda were preserved under the semi-circular plaza adjoining the front portico. In 1949 Gallalee Hall was built to house a new observatory. The last building constructed facing the Quad was the Rose Administration Building, completed in 1969. It was built on the site of the first incarnation of Julia Tutwiler Hall, a dormitory built in 1914 and demolished to make way for the new building. Nott Hall (now Honors Hall), Farrah Hall, Bidgood Hall, Doster Hall, Reese Phifer Hall, Denny Chimes (any many other buildings across the UA campus) were designed by the Birmingham, Alabama architectural firm Miller, Martin & Lewis.

== See also ==
- Gorgas–Manly Historic District
