= Williams gun =

American Confederate cannon

The Williams Gun was a Confederate gun that was classified as a 1-lb cannon. It was designed by Captain D.R. Williams, of Covington, Kentucky, who later served as an artillery captain with a battery of his design. It was a breech-loading, rapid-fire cannon that was operated by a hand-crank. The barrel was four feet long and a 1.57-inch caliber. The hand crank opened the sliding breech which allowed the crew to load a round and cap the primer. As the crank was continued, it closed the breech and automatically released the hammer. The effective range was 800 yards but the maximum range was 2000 yards.

Approximately 40 were made, to supply seven different Confederate batteries. These were made at F. B. Deane Jr. & Son, Lynchburg, Virginia, Tredegar Iron Works, Richmond, Virginia, and Skates & Co, Mobile, Alabama. At the end of the war, four examples of this gun were captured to send to West Point. The West Point Museum retained one gun. Other examples are now located at the Kentucky Military History Museum the Virginia Museum of the Civil War at the New Market Battlefield State Historical Park, and the Watervliet Arsenal Museum.

During the early trials of the gun, the Richmond Daily Exchange dated May 20, 1862, reported that: "General Floyd attended a trial of the Williams' mounted breech-loading rifle, which is claimed will throw twenty balls a minute a distance of fifteen hundred yards". Some sources say it could fire 65 rounds per minute but accuracy was greatly reduced due to the manual loading. The Union troops did not know what the gun was. Some describe it as a rifled cannon. Others reported that it fired nails, probably on account of the noise the projectile made as it tumbled.

== See also ==
- Agar gun
- Confederate Revolving Cannon
- Gatling gun
- Gorgas machine gun
