= University of Alabama Arboretum =

Arboretum in Tuscaloosa, Alabama

- Interactive map of University of Alabama Arboretum
- Location: 4801 Arboretum Way; Tuscaloosa, Alabama 35404
- Coordinates: 33°11′29″N 87°28′30″W
- Area: 60 acres (24 ha)
- Created: 1958
- Operator: The University of Alabama
- Open: 8 a.m. to sunset
- Website: arboretum.ua.edu

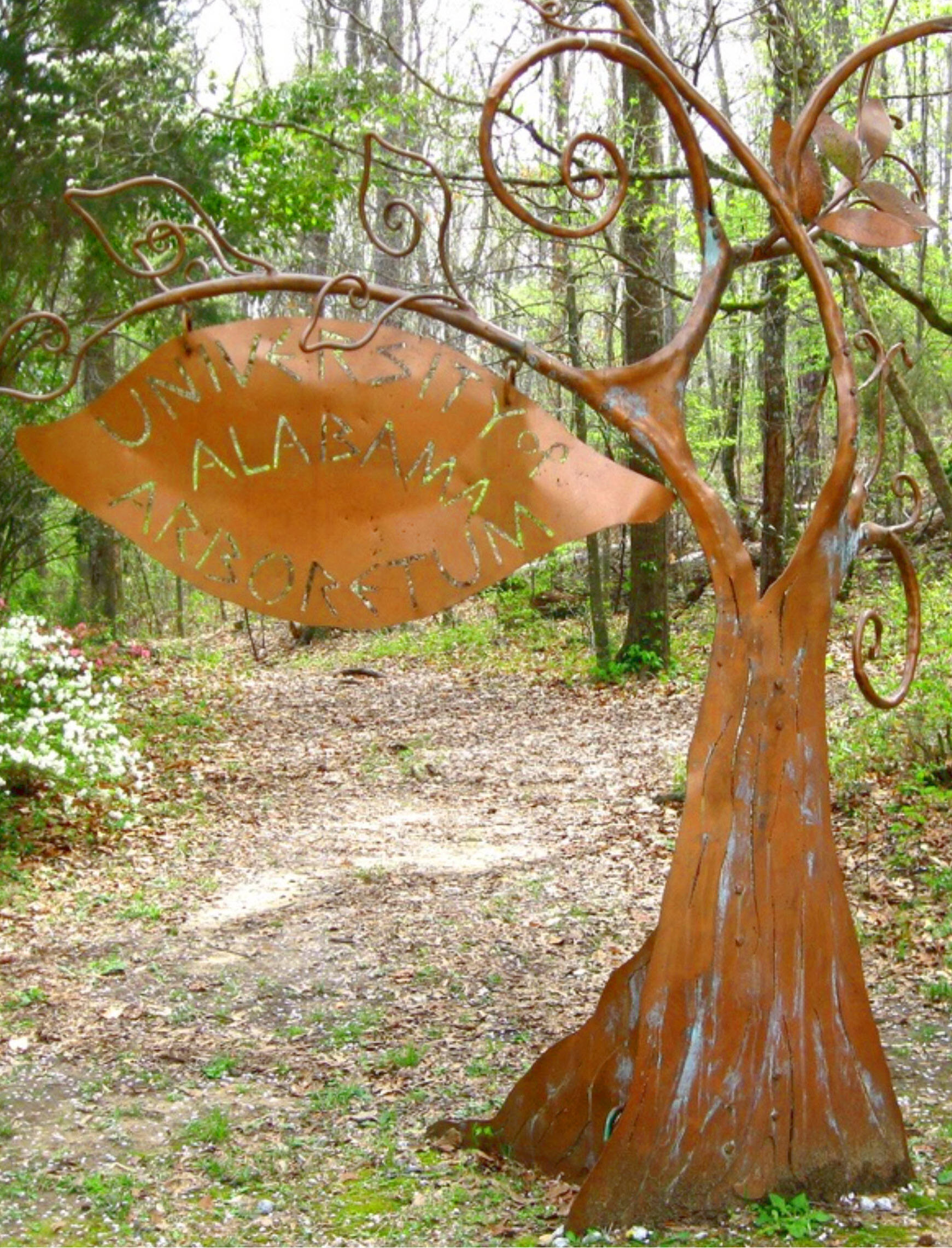
Metal "tree" sign at the entrance to the Arboretum. Fabricated by Sunheart Metalworks.

The University of Alabama Arboretum is a 60-acre (243,000 m^{2}) arboretum located near the intersection of Veterans Memorial Parkway and Pelham Loop Road in Tuscaloosa, Alabama.

The Arboretum's primary emphasis is on Alabama's native flora and fauna. It includes 2.5 miles (4.0 km) of walking trails through native piney woods and oak-hickory climax forest, a wildflower garden containing more than 250 species, ornamental plants, an experimental garden, a bog garden, an open-air pavilion, and a children's garden. Two greenhouses contain collections of orchids, cacti, and tropical plants.

The Arboretum is open daily without charge from sunrise to sunset, except for a few major holidays. It is part of the University of Alabama Museums, which also include the Alabama Museum of Natural History, Gorgas House, Moundville Archaeological Museum, the Office of Archaeological Research, and Paul W. Bryant Museum.

== See also ==
- List of botanical gardens and arboretums in Alabama
