= Moundville Archaeological Museum =

Museum in Alabama

- Location within Alabama
- Established: 16 May 1939
- Location: Moundville, Alabama, United States
- Coordinates: 33.0062°N 87.635°W
- Type: Archaeological
- Owner: University of Alabama
- Website: moundville.ua.edu

The Moundville Archaeological Museum is an archaeological park and museum in Moundville, Alabama The museum houses artifacts and displays exhibits on over 60 years of archaeological excavations and investigations about Moundville.

The Jones Archaeological Museum located in the park was opened on May 16, 1939, and was initially known as the "Mound State Monument."

The museum was originally designed with two wings dedicated to burials which was closed in 1989 and a central section with exhibits displaying artifacts recovered from the site. The previous burial wings were replaced with a theater and several exhibition halls.

The park and museum are part of the University of Alabama Museums, which also include the University of Alabama Arboretum, Alabama Museum of Natural History, Discovering Alabama, Gorgas House, Office of Archaeological Research and Paul W. Bryant Museum.

== See also ==
- List of museums in Alabama
