= Sarah Ann Haynsworth Gayle =

First Lady of Alabama
- In office November 26, 1831 – November 21, 1835
- Governor: John Gayle
- Preceded by: vacant
- Succeeded by: Felicia Steptoe Pickett Chapman

Personal details
- Born: Sarah Ann Haynsworth; January 18, 1804 Sumter County, South Carolina, U.S.
- Died: July 30, 1835 (aged 31) Tuscaloosa, Alabama, U.S.
- Spouse: John Gayle (m. 1819)
- Children: 6, including Amelia Gayle Gorgas
- Relatives: William C. Gorgas (grandson)
- Occupation: writer
- Awards: Alabama Women's Hall of Fame

Sarah Ann Haynsworth Gayle (née, Haynsworth or Haynesworth; 1804–1835) was a 19th-century diarist of the Romantic era. Living in the American South, she kept a journal during the period of 1827 to 1835. According to the Encyclopedia of Alabama, "Her journal is unique as the only surviving account of early Alabama life written by a woman." In 2016, she was inducted into the Alabama Women's Hall of Fame.

== Early life and education ==
Sarah Ann Haynsworth was born January 18, 1804, in Sumter County, South Carolina. Her parents were Richard and Ann (Pringle) Haynsworth, the former born in Sumter District, South Carolina, removed to Mount Vernon, Alabama, later to Claiborne, Alabama, where he lived on his plantation "Sheldon" on the Alabama River in Clarke County, and where he died. She was the granddaughter of Henry and Sarah (Furman) Haynsworth; great-granddaughter of Richard and Elizabeth (Hesse) Haynsworth, the former of Virginia and English descent, the latter a native of Basel, Switzerland, and of Judge Wood and Rachel (Brodhead) Furman.

She was educated at St. Stephens academy.

== Career ==
After her husband became the Governor of Alabama, she dispensed the hospitalities of the governor's mansion at Tuscaloosa, Alabama with dignity and grace. Francis Scott Key, the author of "The Star-Spangled Banner", who was sent by the president of the United States as "Special Commissioner" to Alabama in 1835, addressed to her a "beautiful poem as a personal compliment to herself, which was published and greatly admired." Garrett says: "She was a general favorite, and admired by all for her many shining virtues and talents which adorned social life."

== Personal life ==
On November 14, 1819, at "Sheldon", she married John Gayle, son of Matthew and Mary Rees Gayle. Their children were: Matthew (b. 1820), Sarah Ann (b. 1825), Amelia Ross (b. 1826) (m. Gen. Josiah Gorgas), Mary Rees (b. 1829), Richard Haynsworth (b. 1832), and Anna Maria (b. 1835). Amelia's son, William C. Gorgas, became Surgeon General of the U.S. Army.

== Death and legacy ==
Sarah Ann Haynsworth Gayle died July 30, 1835, in Tuscaloosa, her death occurring as a result of lockjaw, caused by a dental operation.

The Journal of Sarah Haynsworth Gayle, 1827–1835 (2013), edited by Sarah Woolfolk Wiggins, is held in the W. S. Hoole Special Collections Library at the University of Alabama.

== Awards and honors ==
- 2016, Alabama Women's Hall of Fame
