= Paul W. Bryant Museum =

Football museum at the University of Alabama

Coordinates: 33°12′20″N 87°32′7″W

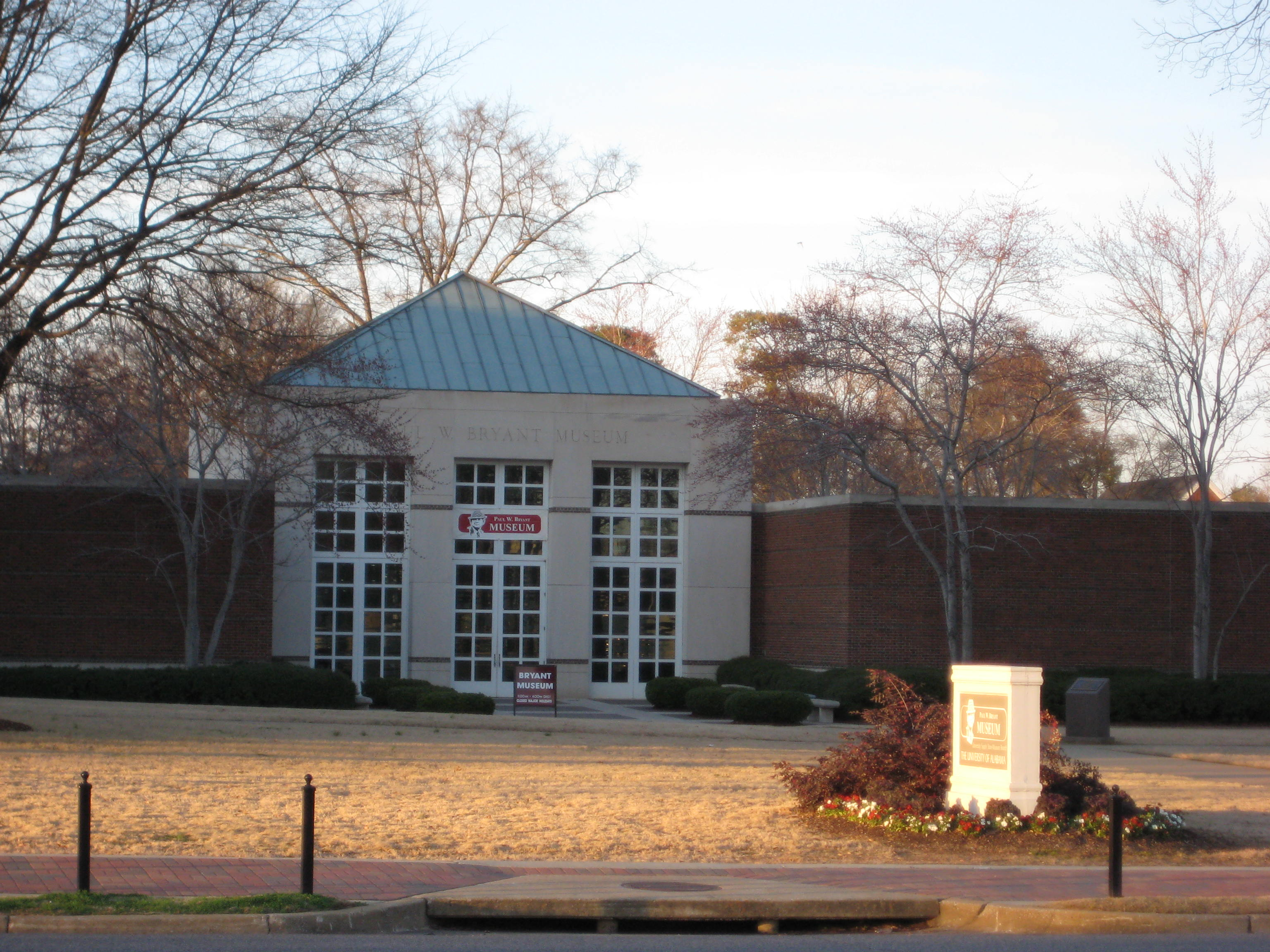
- Established: 1985
- Location: Tuscaloosa, Alabama
- Visitors: 35,000
- Website: www.bryant.ua.edu

The Paul W. Bryant Museum is located on the campus of the University of Alabama, in Tuscaloosa, Alabama. Founded in 1985, the museum was opened in 1988 to "house the history of Alabama football, with special emphasis on the legendary coach" Paul William "Bear" Bryant.

== History ==
On the suggestion of former head football coach Paul "Bear" Bryant, a planning committee was created in 1981 to establish a museum that would honor former coaches and players who helped Bryant set the intercollegiate coaching record for the most victories. The committee considered Bryant's suggestion and established that the museum would take on two missions: "inclusion of the entire football history from the first team in 1892 and creating a collections component establishing the foundation of our current institution". About a third of the collection is about coach Bryant.

Since its inception in 1985, the museum has grown in staff, services, and exhibits. It has become a central source of information for both journalists and writers interested in the history of university athletics. In addition to building its collection, the museum has begun focusing on public programming such as informational and education services and tours for school groups. The University of Alabama campus and the local communities' support have helped to establish the museum as one of the attractions to the region.

Originally organized under the supervision of the University of Alabama Museums system, the Bryant Museum has become a freestanding unit reporting directly to the vice president/provost of the university in response to the growth in mission and function of the museum.

On April 21, 2007, the museum posted its largest ever attendance at 4,367. This was in connection with the school's annual A-Day football game which also saw a record 92,138 fans in the seats.

The museum is part of the University of Alabama Museums, which also include the University of Alabama Arboretum, Alabama Museum of Natural History, Discovering Alabama, Gorgas House, Moundville Archaeological Museum and Office of Archaeological Research.

== Exhibits ==
Among the exhibits at the museum are a Waterford Crystal houndstooth hat which commemorates the Coach's headwear and the Daniel Moore painting used to create the 32-cent U.S. postage stamp which celebrated the life of Bryant.

The traveling Associated Press Trophy awarded from 1957 to 1965 is on display at the museum. Alabama gained permanent possession of this national championship trophy upon winning it for the 3rd time in 1965.

The museum also houses a research room where all of Alabama's games, both victories, defeats and even embarrassments can be viewed and studied. Officials claim over 1,000 such videos.

The museum also maintains a listing of people who were named for Bryant. Bryant's former players and fans have named their children Bryant, Paul, Bear and even Paula after Coach Bryant. Every September, the Paul W. Bryant Museum hosts a namesake reunion and there are over 600 namesakes that have attended this annual event. The oldest namesake (besides Coach Bryant's son Paul Bryant, Jr.) is Bryant Darrell Brown, son of Junction Survivor Darrell Brown who, due to being academically ineligible to play in 1956, surprised even Coach Bryant when he came back to play his last year of eligibility on Texas A&M's 1957 team which was ranked #1 at the time Coach Bryant accepted Alabama's offer. Darrell was the only Junction Boy to also play in Coach Bryant's last season at Texas A&M. Darrell Brown's grandson, Bryant Andrew Brown, is a second generation Bryant namesake. At over 600 names it is not definitive, but the list supports the idea that many Alabamians were enamored enough of the coach to name their children in his honor.

In addition to its permanent exhibits, the museum is often noted for presenting a wide range of memorabilia related to college football culture, including archival materials, photographs, and historical artifacts that illustrate the development of the sport in the southeastern United States. Such collections contribute to the broader understanding of regional sports heritage and its cultural significance.

== See also ==
- Walk of Champions (University of Alabama)
- Alabama Sports Hall of Fame
