= President's Mansion (University of Alabama) =

Historic house in Alabama, United States

- U.S. National Register of Historic Places
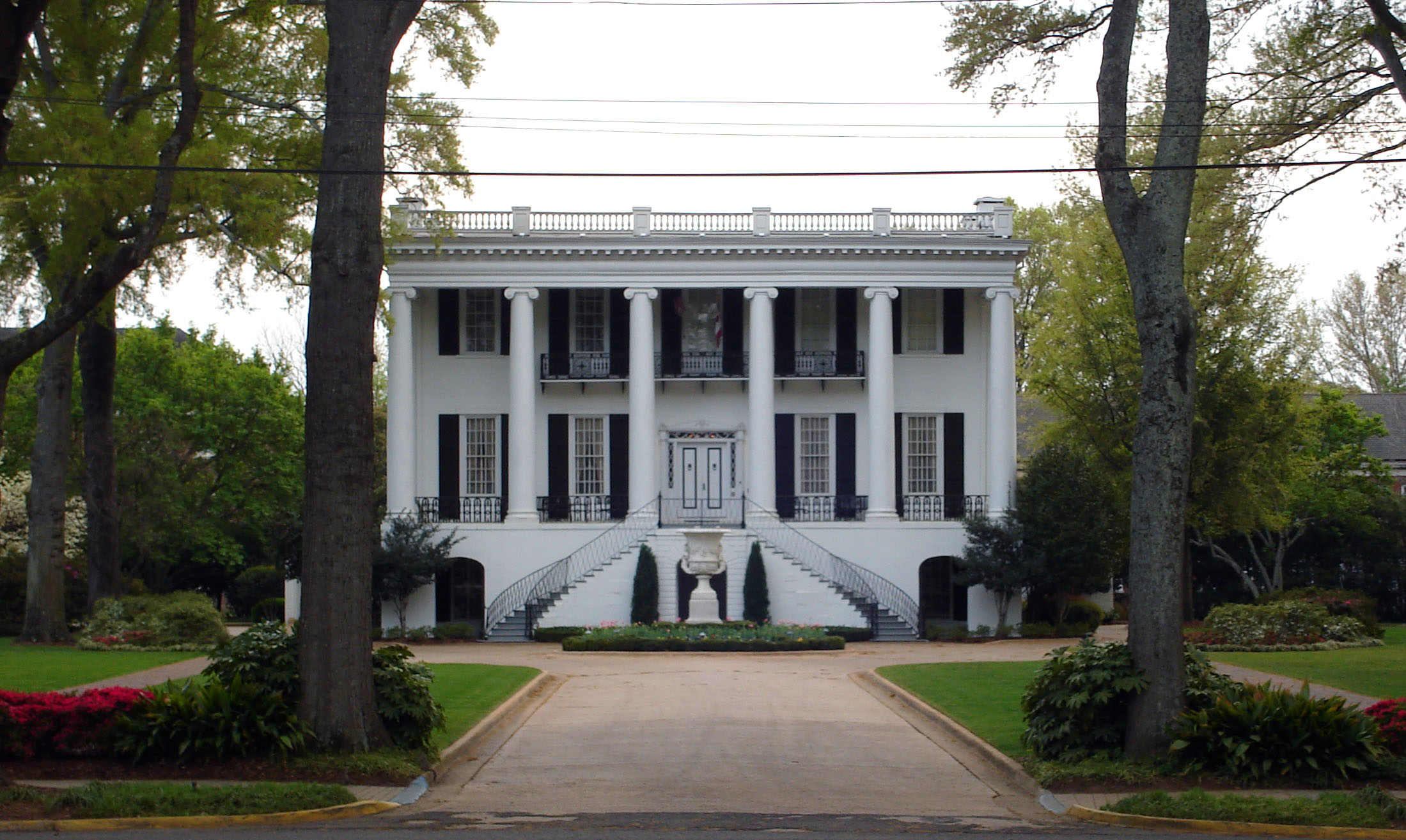
- The President's Mansion in 2007

- Location within Alabama Location within the United States
- Interactive map showing the location for President’s Mansion
- Location: University of Alabama; Tuscaloosa, Alabama
- Coordinates: 33°12′32″N 87°32′47″W
- Area: less than one acre
- Built: 1841
- Architect: Michael Barry
- Architectural style: Greek Revival
- NRHP reference No.: 72000186
- Added to NRHP: January 14, 1972

The President's Mansion is a historic Greek Revival style mansion on the campus of the University of Alabama in Tuscaloosa, Alabama. It has served as the official residence of university presidents ever since its completion in 1841. The structure narrowly avoided destruction during the American Civil War, making it one of the oldest surviving buildings on campus today. The mansion was added to the National Register of Historic Places on January 14, 1972, due to its architectural and historical significance.

== History ==
The history of the President's Mansion began in 1838 when the university trustees set apart funds for a residence suitable for the president of the young institution. While the plans for the university and its already completed buildings had been designed by William Nichols in the late 1820s and early 1830s, he had left the state and was busy with new projects by this time. The new house was designed by Michael Barry, in a Greek Revival style complementary to the existing Nichols-designed campus buildings. The trustees chose a site adjoining what today is the south side of The Quad, in an area which had been originally designated in the Nichols' plan as the future medical school grounds. Construction on the building began in 1839 and was completed in 1841.

The first occupant of the mansion was Basil Manly, Sr., the second university president. Serving from 1837 until 1855, Manly was widely considered to be a popular president. Nevertheless, he and the trustees were criticized by members of the Alabama Legislature for the "unnecessarily lavish" structure. The next president to live in the house was Landon Garland, whose tenure would see the destruction of the university in 1865. Disturbed by what he viewed as student discipline problems, Garland advocated the conversion of the university over to the military system as soon as he assumed the presidency. As tensions between Northern and Southern factions became heightened in the lead-up to the Civil War, the state legislature finally acquiesced to his request on February 23, 1860. This decision would prove disastrous, as it turned the school into a military target. During the war the university became known as the "West Point of the Confederacy," sending roughly 200 cadets into the field each year.

On April 3, 1865, Union Brigadier General John T. Croxton and 1500 cavalrymen approached Tuscaloosa. Croxton had orders to destroy all targets of military value in the town. Tuscaloosa was captured on that day, and all of its factories and the river bridge destroyed. On April 4, Croxton sent Colonel Thomas M. Johnston and two hundred men to burn the university. In the midst of carrying out his orders, university faculty pleaded with Johnston to spare the library rotunda. Johnston sent a message via courier to Croxton, asking if he might spare the building. Croxton replied "My orders leave me no discretion... My orders are to destroy all public buildings."

Although technically a private residence, the President's Mansion was also set on fire that day. Tradition maintains that the president's wife, Louisa Frances Garland, arrived at the mansion from the temporary refuge of Bryce Hospital just as soldiers were setting a pile of furniture inside the building alight. She persuaded them to douse the flames, thus sparing the house. The mansion was one of only seven buildings on the campus spared destruction; the others were the Gorgas House, Little Round House, Observatory and a few faculty residences.

== Architecture ==
The design for the three-story stuccoed brick structure features a high arcuated ground floor, with the stucco on the front of this level giving the appearance of ashlar. It is surmounted by two upper principle floors, accessed by a centrally placed double staircase at ground level. The front facade is five bays wide, with the two principal floors fronted by a monumentally scaled hexastyle portico, utilizing the Ionic order.

The mansion has been renovated on numerous occasions in the more than 160 years since it was completed. One of the largest changes came in 1908, when the exterior assumed its predominantly white appearance.

== See also ==
- National Register of Historic Places listings in Tuscaloosa County, Alabama
