= Gorgias (disambiguation) =

Gorgias was a Greek sophist, pre-socratic philosopher and rhetorician.

Gorgias may also refer to:

- Gorgias (dialogue), an important Socratic dialogue
- Gorgias of Macedon (4th century BC), an officer of Alexander the Great
- Gorgias (general) (2nd century BC), Syrian-Seleucid General
- Gorgias Press, an American academic publisher
- Gorgias (plural), an Angloromani version of the term Gadjo

== See also ==
- Gorgas (disambiguation)
- Gorgasia, a genus of garden eel
- Tuscan gorgia, a phonological process in the Tuscan dialect of Italian
