= Agar gun =

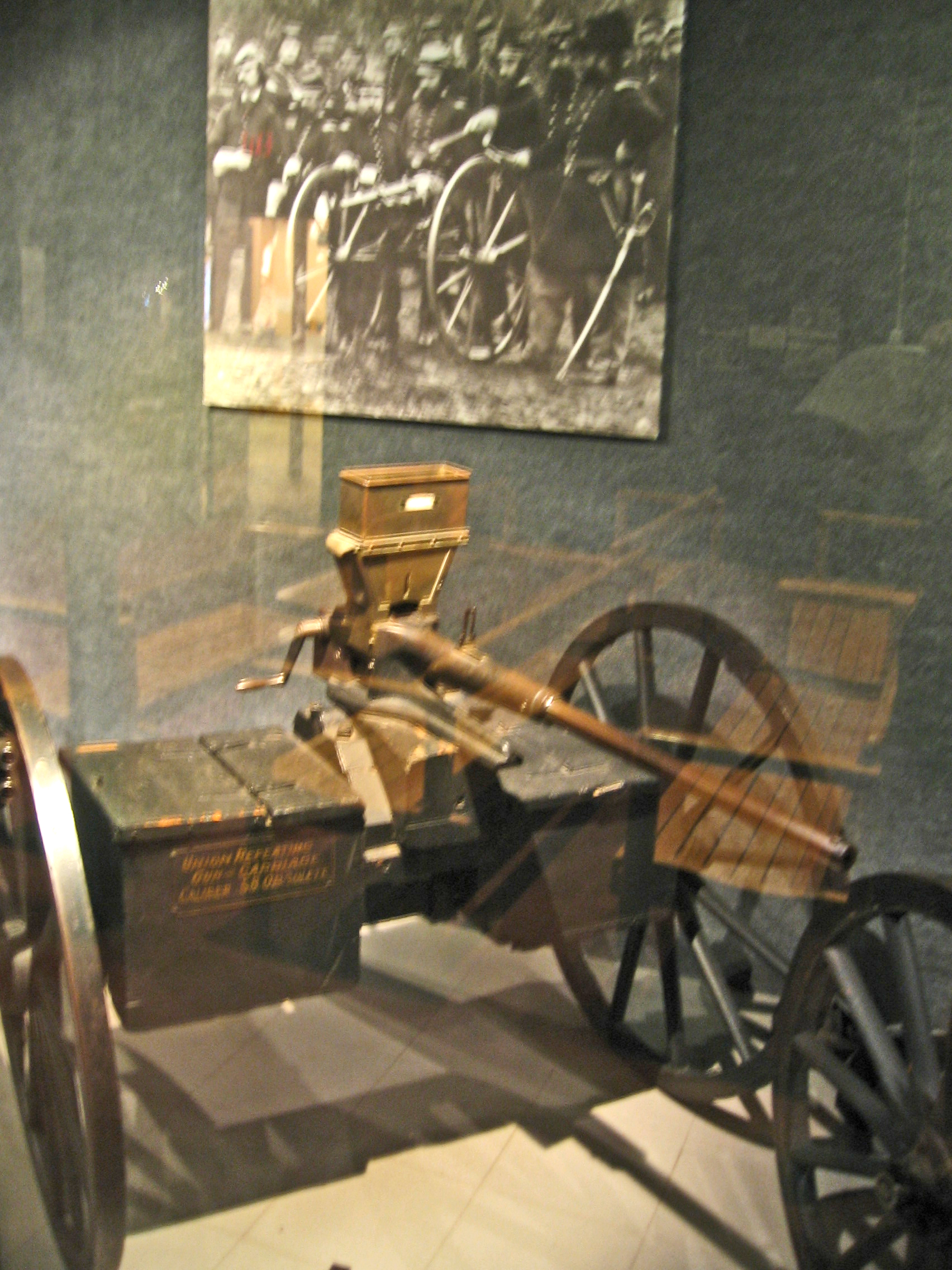
- The weapon at the Springfield Armory Museum
- Type: Hand cranked machine gun
- Place of origin: United States

Service history
- In service: 1861–1865
- Used by: United States; Confederate States of America (captured)
- Wars: American Civil War

Production history
- Designer: Wilson Agar
- Designed: 1861

Specifications
- Caliber: .58 in (14.73 mm)
- Rate of fire: 120 rounds per minute

The Agar gun (or Ager) was an early rapid fire machine gun developed during the US Civil War. The weapon was nicknamed the Coffee Mill Gun, and was also called the Union Repeating Gun.

== History ==
During the Civil War, inventors were encouraged to create new and better weapons. The Agar machine gun was one of about seventy or so hand-cranked machine guns developed for the war during this period. It was named after its inventor, Wilson Agar (sometimes spelled Wilson Ager). The gun was nicknamed the "Coffee Mill Gun" because the crank and the ammunition hopper on the top of the weapon gave it a look similar to that of a common kitchen coffee grinder.

Agar advertised the gun as "an army in six feet square", due to its high rate of fire. In 1861, the Agar machine gun was demonstrated to President Abraham Lincoln, who was very impressed by the weapon. Lincoln wrote "I saw this gun myself, and witnessed some experiments with it, and I really think it is worth the attention of the Government." Ten of the weapons were purchased immediately. The Union eventually ordered fifty-four additional guns.

Throughout the war, these weapons were used, though not extensively. In January 1862 the 28th Pennsylvania Volunteer Infantry were said to have used the Agar Guns in a skirmish by Harpers Ferry. In another skirmish at Middleburg, Virginia, on March 29, 1862, a captain by the name of Bartlett recalled Union soldiers firing an Agar Gun at attacking Confederate cavalry at a distance of 800 yards, inflicting many casualties and causing the Rebels to flee. The "Coffee Mill" gun was also used somewhat by the Union during McClellan's Peninsula campaign in 1862. The Union Army was not the only one to have used the "Coffee Mill" guns. In September 1862, Confederates obtained seventeen of the machine guns when they captured Harpers Ferry, and used them sparingly in 1864.

== Design and features ==
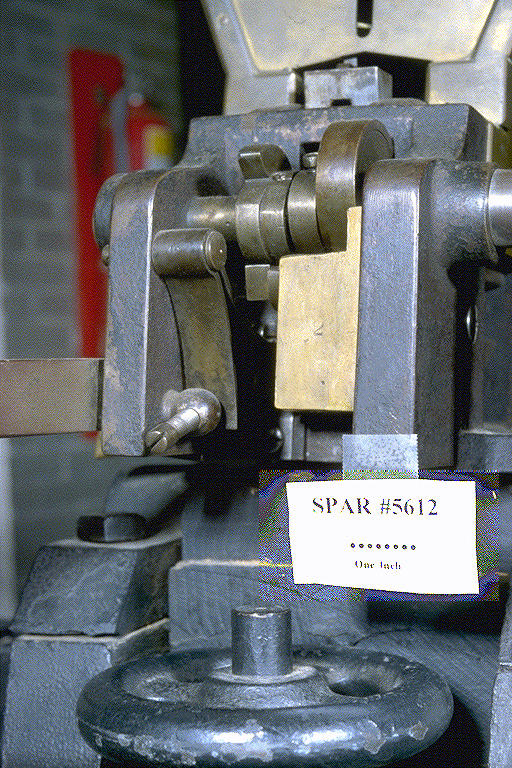
Breech detail seen from the rear; the bottom of the hopper funnel appears in the top right corner

The Agar machine gun fired .58 caliber cartridges. Standard paper cartridges were loaded into re-usable metal tubes. A separate percussion cap was fitted to a nipple at the rear of this tube, effectively creating a centerfire cartridge, and the loaded tubes were placed into a funnel shaped hopper, which gave the weapon its "coffee mill" appearance.

The weapon was fired using a hand crank, located at the rear of the gun. The crank would feed rounds into the weapon from the hopper, and would fire them one by one. A wedge shaped block would rise up and lock the round in place, a cam operated hammer would then strike the percussion cap, firing the round. The empty metal tubes would subsequently be collected in a pan located under the weapon. The metal tubes would then be reloaded and placed back in the hopper. This made quite a bit of work for the gun crews, since the tubes had to be reloaded quickly enough to keep up with the machine gun's relatively high rate of fire.

The Agar machine gun had a single barrel. This design proved to be prone to overheating, especially during periods of sustained fire. The overheating problem was ameliorated somewhat through the use of replacement barrels which could be swapped when the barrel in use overheated. Two spare barrels were typically carried with each gun. Agar also added a cooling mechanism to the barrel, which consisted of a metal jacket through which air was forced to provide cooling. The air came from a turbine, which was powered by the same hand crank that was used to fire the weapon. This cooling air also tended to blow away any pieces of unburned paper from the cartridge that happened to be near the barrel. The rate of fire was limited to 120 rounds per minute, which also helped to prevent overheating.

The Agar gun can be classified as a multiple-chamber, single-barrel design. In this classification scheme, it is in the same category as the much better known revolver cannons, still in use today. The Agar gun's hopper is in fact the only multiple-chamber configuration other than the ubiquitous revolver to have been used in practice.

The Agar machine gun also had a built-in steel shield, which was a design feature not seen on other machine guns of the period. This gave the Agar a much more modern appearance, since single barrel machine guns with similar shields became common in World War I.

== Use ==
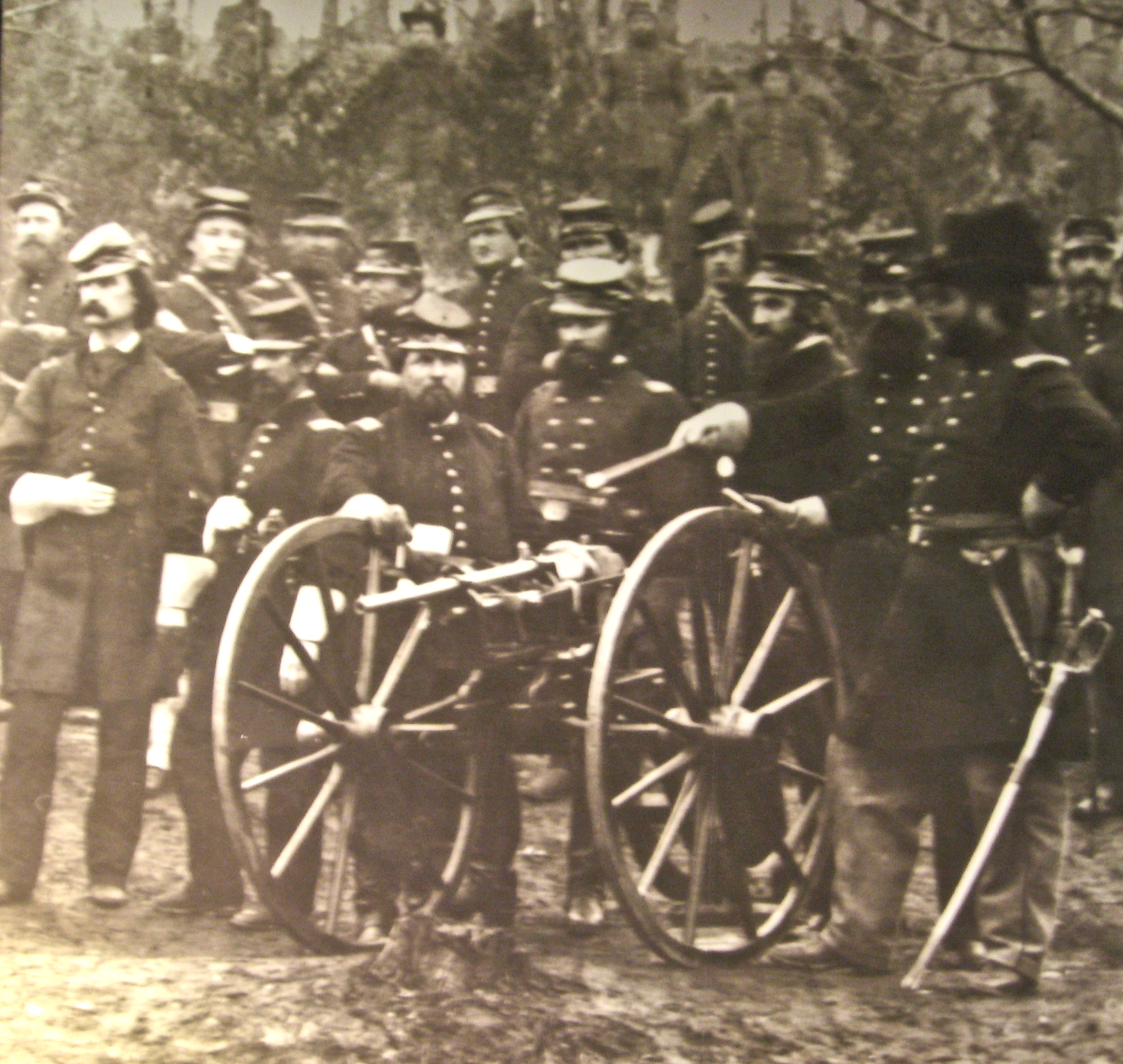
Ager "Coffee Mill" gun in the hands of the 96th Pennsylvania Volunteer Regiment, Camp Northumberland, northern Virginia, February 1862

In 1861, the Agar machine gun was demonstrated to President Abraham Lincoln at Washington Arsenal. He was so impressed that he ordered all ten available weapons to be purchased immediately, at a cost of $1,300 each, which was a very high price at the time. Later in the same year, General McClellan ordered an additional fifty weapons, at a reduced cost of $735 each. In 1861, General Butler purchased two guns at $1,300 each, and in the following year General Fremont also purchased two guns, paying $1,500 for each.

The guns were condemned by the Ordnance Department for using too much ammunition to ever be practical, and the guns saw little use on the battlefield. They were often deployed to remote locations to guard bridges and narrow passes. The guns often performed poorly in the field. The single barrel design proved prone to overheating, and the weapon was also prone to jamming. The special steel tubes used to hold the cartridges were heavy and expensive, and tended to get lost. Later cartridges used brass, but this was not widely available during the time that the Agar machine gun was used. The gun's range was also criticized. It had a range of about 800 yards, which was roughly the same as the range of the rifle-muskets used by infantry. A longer range weapon would have been preferred.

Because of the way it was used in battle, the Agar machine gun, like most machine guns of the period, was never able to show its potential. Machine guns later became much more important on the battlefield. In 1865, the few remaining Agar machine guns were sold for $500 each.

== See also ==
- Confederate Revolving Cannon
- Gatling gun
- Gorgas machine gun
- Lowell machine gun
