= AP Trophy =

American college football trophy

Associated Press Trophy
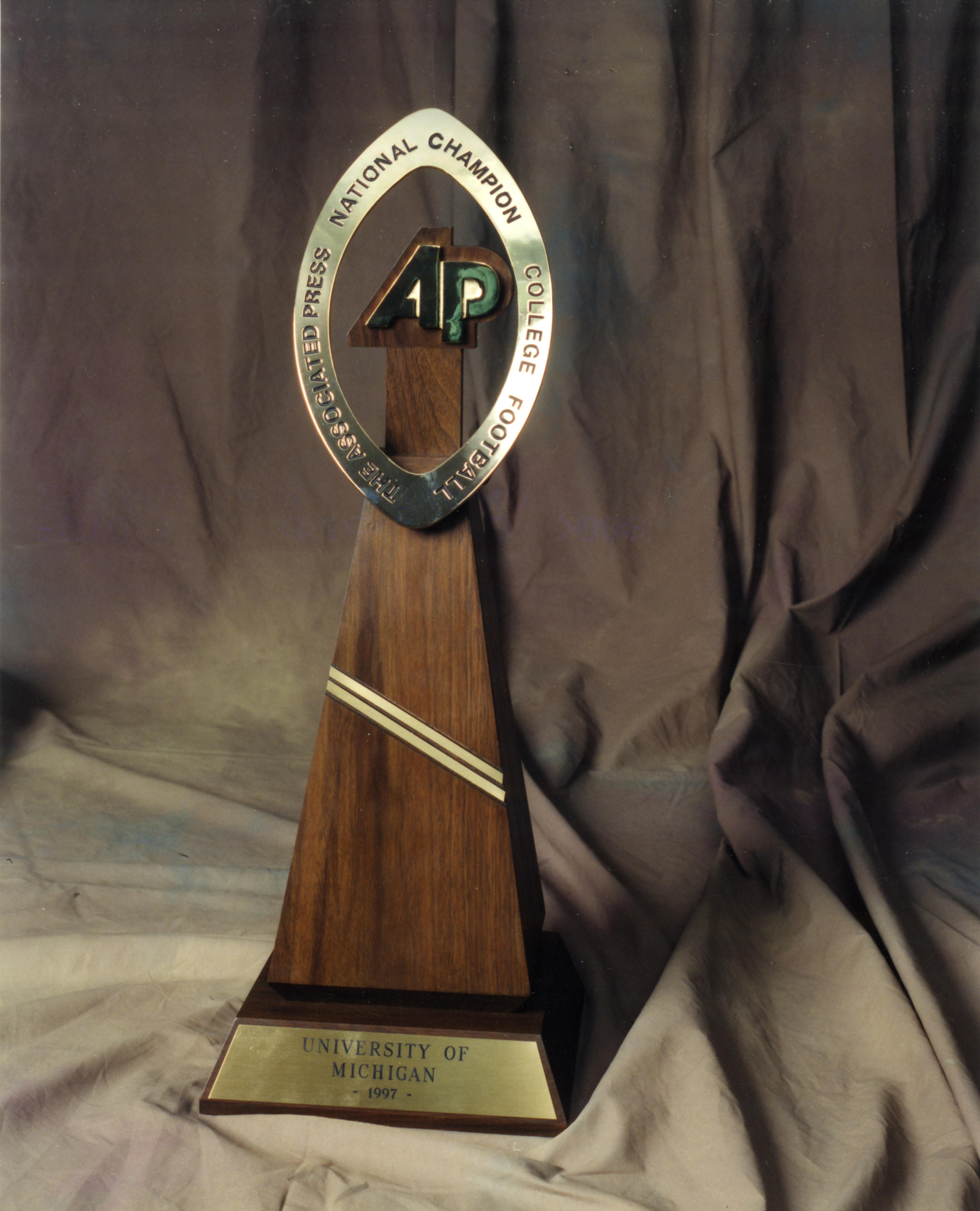
- The Associated Press Trophy that was awarded to the 1997 Michigan Wolverines
- Awarded for: the Associated Press college football National Champion
- Country: United States
- Presented by: Associated Press

History
- First award: 1936
- Most recent: Indiana

The Associated Press (AP) Trophy is the annual award given by the Associated Press (AP) to the team ranked No. 1 in the season's final AP Poll. The trophy is emblematic of the college football national championship as awarded by the Associated Press.

The current version of trophy consists of a silver or gold football suspended above a base which contains the letters "AP" (for Associated Press), along with the information on who the recipient of the trophy was.

Until the 1968 college football season, the final AP poll of the season was released following the end of the regular season, with the exception of the 1965 season.

Prior to the College Football Playoff (CFP) and Bowl Championship Series (BCS), a tournament or championship game was not held to determine the national champion of what is now the highest level, NCAA Division I Football Bowl Subdivision (FBS) due to the long-standing historical ties between individual college football conferences and high-paying bowl games like the Rose Bowl and Orange Bowl. The NCAA did, however, recognize a national champion based upon the final results of major "wire-service" (AP and Coaches') polls. The extent of that recognition came in the form of acknowledgment in the annual NCAA Football Guide of the "unofficial" national champions. As a result, the public and the media began to acknowledge the leading vote-getter in the final AP Poll as the national champion for that season.

The Associated Press was not tied to the BCS, and the trophy could be awarded to a team which did not win the BCS National Championship Game. This has happened once after the 2003 season when LSU won the BCS title game, but USC received a higher total of votes in the final AP Poll, and therefore received the AP National Championship Trophy. Teams serving NCAA postseason bans are still eligible for the AP National Championship. This has occurred twice, following the 1957 and 1974 seasons.

== Trophies ==
=== No trophy (1936–1940) ===
In its initial years, the AP Poll did not award a trophy.

The preeminent national championship trophy of the era was the Knute Rockne Memorial Trophy awarded by the Dickinson System. Following the retirement of Frank G. Dickinson and his rating system in 1940, Minnesota tasked the AP Poll with awarding the new trophy it put into play.

=== Williams Trophy (1941–1947) ===
From 1941–1947, the No. 1 team in the final Associated Press poll was awarded the Dr. Henry L. Williams Trophy. The trophy, named in honor of Minnesota head coach Henry L. Williams, was donated by the Golden Gophers after they permanently retired the Dickinson System's Rockne Trophy by winning it for the third time in 1940.

The Williams trophy was retired when it was won for the third time by Notre Dame in 1947.

=== O'Donnell Trophy (1948–1956) ===
Following their retirement of the Williams trophy, Notre Dame donated the Rev. J. Hugh O'Donnell Memorial Trophy to be presented to the 1948 national champion as determined by the Associated Press poll. Like the previous college football national championship trophies, it was to be permanently retired by the first team to win it three times.

Oklahoma retained permanent possession of the O'Donnell trophy after winning it for the third time in 1956.

=== Bryant Trophy (1957–1965) ===
A dedicated Associated Press Trophy was commissioned following the retirement of the O'Donnell Trophy by Oklahoma. The AP Trophy was first awarded to Auburn for their 1957 AP national championship. Like the previous national championship trophies, the "huge, 40-inch high, bronze" Associated Press trophy would be kept by the first school to win it three times.

This original "big, silver" AP trophy was retired by Alabama in 1965, upon winning their third AP title in five years. Upon permanently awarding the trophy to Alabama, the Associated Press named it the Paul W. Bryant Trophy. This AP trophy is still held by Alabama and is on display at the Paul W. Bryant Museum on the university campus in Tuscaloosa.

=== AP Trophy (1966–1977) ===
Another traveling Associated Press Trophy was awarded from 1966–1977. It was retired permanently by Notre Dame following their third win of the trophy.

=== Bryant Trophy (1978–1989) ===
A new traveling Associated Press Trophy was put into competition for the 1978 season. Following the death of the great coach in January 1983, this trophy was renamed the Paul W. "Bear" Bryant Trophy. This same name had previously been given to the AP trophy used from 1957–1965, upon it being won 3 times and retired by the coach's Alabama team.

This Bryant trophy was retired by the University of Miami, which gained permanent possession after their 3 wins in 1983, 1987, and 1989. The trophy currently resides at the University of Miami Sports Hall of Fame.

=== AP Trophy (1990–present) ===
Since the conclusion of the 1990 season, the AP has annually awarded an individual Associated Press Trophy to the school that finishes No. 1 in the final AP Poll (signifying that team as the national champion in Division I-A / FBS).

== Winners ==
The following teams have finished in the No. 1 spot in the final AP Poll of the season for college football:

=== By year ===
Season	School	Head coach
1936	Minnesota	Bernie Bierman
1937	Pittsburgh	Jock Sutherland
1938	TCU	Dutch Meyer
1939	Texas A&M	Homer Norton
1940	Minnesota	Bernie Bierman
1941	Minnesota	Bernie Bierman
1942	Ohio State	Paul Brown
1943	Notre Dame	Frank Leahy
1944	Army	Earl Blaik
1945	Army	Earl Blaik
1946	Notre Dame	Frank Leahy
1947	Notre Dame	Frank Leahy
1948	Michigan	Bennie Oosterbaan
1949	Notre Dame	Frank Leahy
1950	Oklahoma	Bud Wilkinson
1951	Tennessee	Robert Neyland
1952	Michigan State	Biggie Munn
1953	Maryland	Jim Tatum
1954	Ohio State	Woody Hayes
1955	Oklahoma	Bud Wilkinson
1956	Oklahoma	Bud Wilkinson
1957	Auburn	Ralph Jordan
1958	LSU	Paul Dietzel
1959	Syracuse	Ben Schwartzwalder
1960	Minnesota	Murray Warmath
1961	Alabama	Bear Bryant
1962	USC	John McKay
1963	Texas	Darrell Royal
1964	Alabama	Bear Bryant
1965	Alabama	Bear Bryant
1966	Notre Dame	Ara Parseghian
1967	USC	John McKay
1968	Ohio State	Woody Hayes
1969	Texas	Darrell Royal
1970	Nebraska	Bob Devaney
1971	Nebraska	Bob Devaney
1972	USC	John McKay
1973	Notre Dame	Ara Parseghian
1974	Oklahoma	Barry Switzer
1975	Oklahoma	Barry Switzer
1976	Pittsburgh	Johnny Majors
1977	Notre Dame	Dan Devine
1978	Alabama	Bear Bryant
1979	Alabama	Bear Bryant
1980	Georgia	Vince Dooley
1981	Clemson	Danny Ford
1982	Penn State	Joe Paterno
1983	Miami (FL)	Howard Schnellenberger
1984	BYU	LaVell Edwards
1985	Oklahoma	Barry Switzer
1986	Penn State	Joe Paterno
1987	Miami (FL)	Jimmy Johnson
1988	Notre Dame	Lou Holtz
1989	Miami (FL)	Dennis Erickson
1990	Colorado	Bill McCartney
1991	Miami (FL)	Dennis Erickson
1992	Alabama	Gene Stallings
1993	Florida State	Bobby Bowden
1994	Nebraska	Tom Osborne
1995	Nebraska	Tom Osborne
1996	Florida	Steve Spurrier
1997	Michigan	Lloyd Carr
1998	Tennessee	Phillip Fulmer
1999	Florida State	Bobby Bowden
2000	Oklahoma	Bob Stoops
2001	Miami (FL)	Larry Coker
2002	Ohio State	Jim Tressel
2003	USC	Pete Carroll
2004	USC	Pete Carroll
2005	Texas	Mack Brown
2006	Florida	Urban Meyer
2007	LSU	Les Miles
2008	Florida	Urban Meyer
2009	Alabama	Nick Saban
2010	Auburn	Gene Chizik
2011	Alabama	Nick Saban
2012	Alabama	Nick Saban
2013	Florida State	Jimbo Fisher
2014	Ohio State	Urban Meyer
2015	Alabama	Nick Saban
2016	Clemson	Dabo Swinney
2017	Alabama	Nick Saban
2018	Clemson	Dabo Swinney
2019	LSU	Ed Orgeron
2020	Alabama	Nick Saban
2021	Georgia	Kirby Smart
2022	Georgia	Kirby Smart
2023	Michigan	Jim Harbaugh
2024	Ohio State	Ryan Day
2025	Indiana	Curt Cignetti

=== By team ===
Team	Number	Seasons
Alabama	12	1961, 1964, 1965, 1978, 1979, 1992, 2009, 2011, 2012, 2015, 2017, 2020
Notre Dame	8	1943, 1946, 1947, 1949, 1966, 1973, 1977, 1988
Oklahoma	7	1950, 1955, 1956, 1974, 1975, 1985, 2000
Ohio State	6	1942, 1954, 1968, 2002, 2014, 2024
Miami (FL)	5	1983, 1987, 1989, 1991, 2001
USC	5	1962, 1967, 1972, 2003, 2004
Minnesota	4	1936, 1940, 1941, 1960
Nebraska	4	1970, 1971, 1994, 1995
Clemson	3	1981, 2016, 2018
Florida	3	1996, 2006, 2008
Florida State	3	1993, 1999, 2013
Georgia	3	1980, 2021, 2022
LSU	3	1958, 2007, 2019
Michigan	3	1948, 1997, 2023
Texas	3	1963, 1969, 2005
Army	2	1944, 1945
Auburn	2	1957, 2010
Penn State	2	1982, 1986
Pittsburgh	2	1937, 1976
Tennessee	2	1951, 1998
BYU	1	1984
Colorado	1	1990
Indiana	1	2025
Maryland	1	1953
Michigan State	1	1952
Syracuse	1	1959
TCU	1	1938
Texas A&M	1	1939
