= Confederate revolving cannon =

Confederate Revolving Cannon
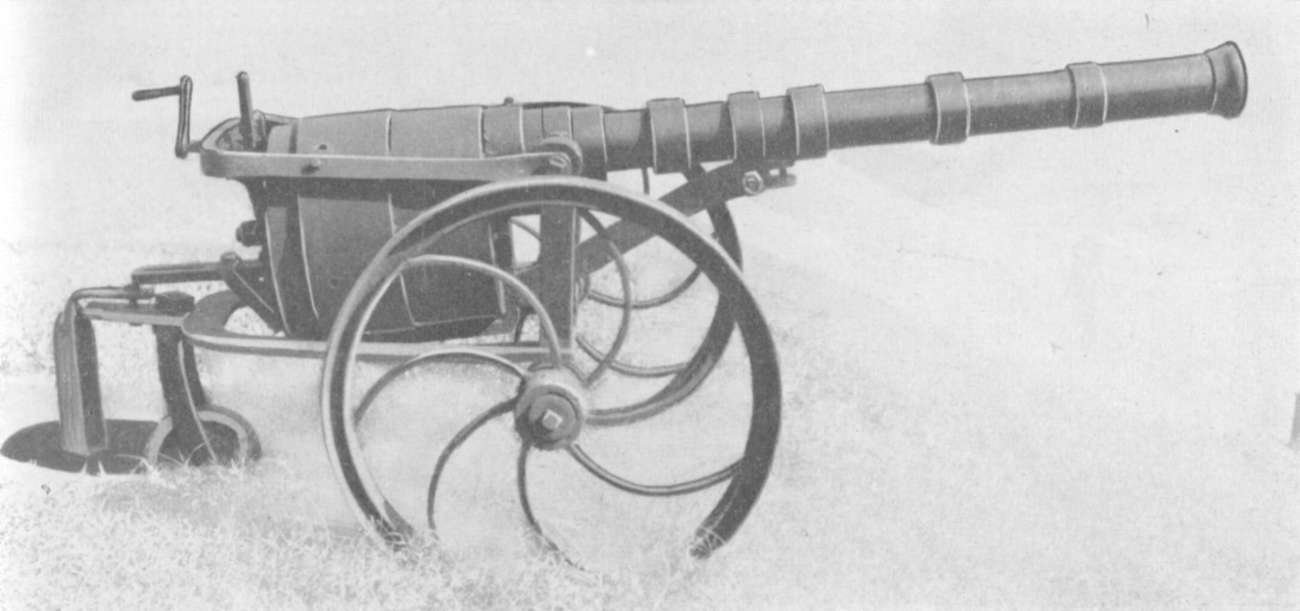
- Confederate revolving cannon
- Place of origin: Confederate States of America

Service history
- In service: 1861–1865
- Used by: Confederate States of America
- Wars: American Civil War

Production history
- Designer: Henry Clay Pate
- Designed: 1861

The Confederate revolving cannon was a weapon developed and used during the U.S. Civil War. The weapon had a design similar to that of a revolver pistol, scaled up to the size of a cannon.

== History ==
Henry Clay Pate was a former attorney who, during the U.S. Civil War, organized a mounted company that was called Pate's Rangers or the Petersburg Rangers. The innovative Pate designed the revolving cannon, which he had cast at the Petersburg foundry in Petersburg, Virginia. This cannon was then made available to Pate's unit.

The cannon saw use in the siege of Petersburg. It was captured by Union troops at Danville, Va, on April 27, 1865. While innovative, the weapon did not play a significant role on the battlefield. After its capture, the cannon was sent to the Ordnance Laboratory, United States Military Academy, West Point, New York.

== Design and features ==
The revolving cannon was designed with the goal of increasing the fire rate of a cannon. The design was similar to that of a revolving pistol of the time, consisting of a cylinder which contained the rounds to be fired, with the rotation of the cylinder being used to bring a round into position at the breech of a single barrel. The barrel had a two-inch bore, and the cylinder held five rounds.

The cylinders of the revolving cannon were fired using percussion caps. The cap was struck by a large spring-actuated striker.

The cannon employed a screw mechanism which pushed the cylinder forward when it was in position. This reduced the gap between the cylinder and the barrel, which significantly reduced gas leakage during firing.

A lever attached to a ratcheting mechanism was used to rotate the cylinder. A spring-loaded cog would slip into recesses in the cylinder, holding it in the correct position for firing.

== See also ==
- Gatling gun
- Gorgas machine gun
- Puckle gun
- Revolver cannon
- Williams gun
