= Old University of Alabama Observatory =

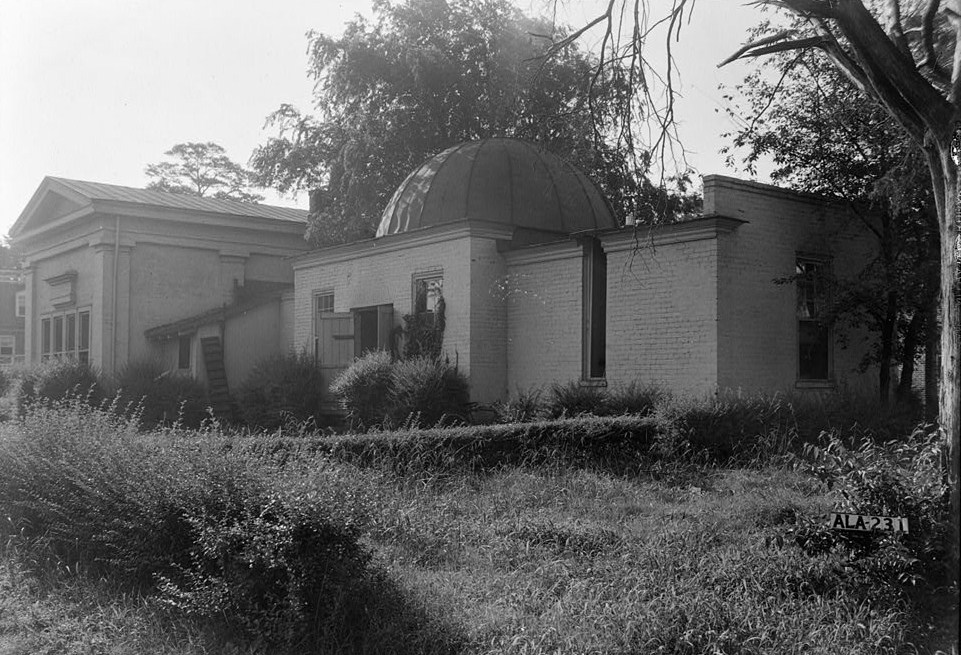
- The old observatory in 1936
- Alternative names: Frederick R. Maxwell Hall
- Organization: University of Alabama
- Location: Tuscaloosa, Alabama, United States
- Coordinates: 33.21104°N 87.55014°W
- Established: 1844
- Website: University of Alabama Astronomy Program

Telescopes
- Unnamed: Troughton & Simms 4" refracting transit
- Unnamed: Troughton & Simms 8" refracting equatorial
- Related media on Commons

The Old University of Alabama Observatory, now known as Frederick R. Maxwell Hall, was an astronomical observatory owned and operated by the University of Alabama in Tuscaloosa, Alabama. Although no longer used as an observatory, the building has been restored and preserved. It currently houses the university's Collaborative Arts Research Initiative (CARI), an interdisciplinary, arts-focused research engine driven by the interests of faculty from across the university. By facilitating collaborations across disciplines, CARI maximizes the impact of faculty arts research, while enriching the university, local, and regional communities. Significant for its architectural and historical importance, it was added to the National Register of Historic Places on January 14, 1972.

== History ==
- Old Observatory
- U.S. National Register of Historic Places
- Built: 1844
- Architectural style: Greek Revival
- NRHP reference No.: 72000187
- Added to NRHP: January 14, 1972

The Greek Revival-style observatory building was completed in 1844, though the equatorial mounted Troughton & Simms 8-inch (0.20 m) refracting telescope was not mounted until 1849. The observation room was built with a large central section, capped by a revolving 18-foot (5.5 m) diameter dome. At the west end of the building was a transit instrument room with a north–south slit in the roof. Opposite the transit room was an office. The transit room contained a Troughton and Simms transit circle with a 4-inch (0.10 m) objective and a focal length of 5 feet (1.5 m). It used a 4-foot (1.2 m) circle, readable to a single arc second.

The University of Alabama, converted to a military campus at the time, was largely destroyed during a Federal raid led by General John Croxton on April 4, 1865. The observatory was one of seven buildings on campus that escaped being burned to the ground, although it suffered extensive damage. The lens had been sent to nearby Bryce Hospital for safekeeping, although parts of the telescope were removed by some of the troops as trophies. The other campus buildings to survive the event were the President's Mansion (1841), Gorgas House (1829), the Little Round House (1860), and a few faculty residences.

Though the observatory and instruments had been damaged in the raid, the telescopes and observatory were still usable for teaching purposes until the 1890s. A new observatory was built in Gallalee Hall in 1949 and a new telescope was installed by 1950. The old observatory building was known simply as the Old Observatory until 1985, when it was renamed in honor of Frederick R. Maxwell, a retired consulting engineer for the university who had been responsible for protecting and preserving the remnants of the 1800s university campus. Following the renaming of the building it has been home to the Computer Based Honors Program and the university's Creative Campus program. It currently houses the university's Collaborative Arts Research Initiative.

== See also ==
- University of Alabama Observatory
- List of observatories
- National Register of Historic Places listings in Tuscaloosa County, Alabama
