= University of Alabama Observatory =

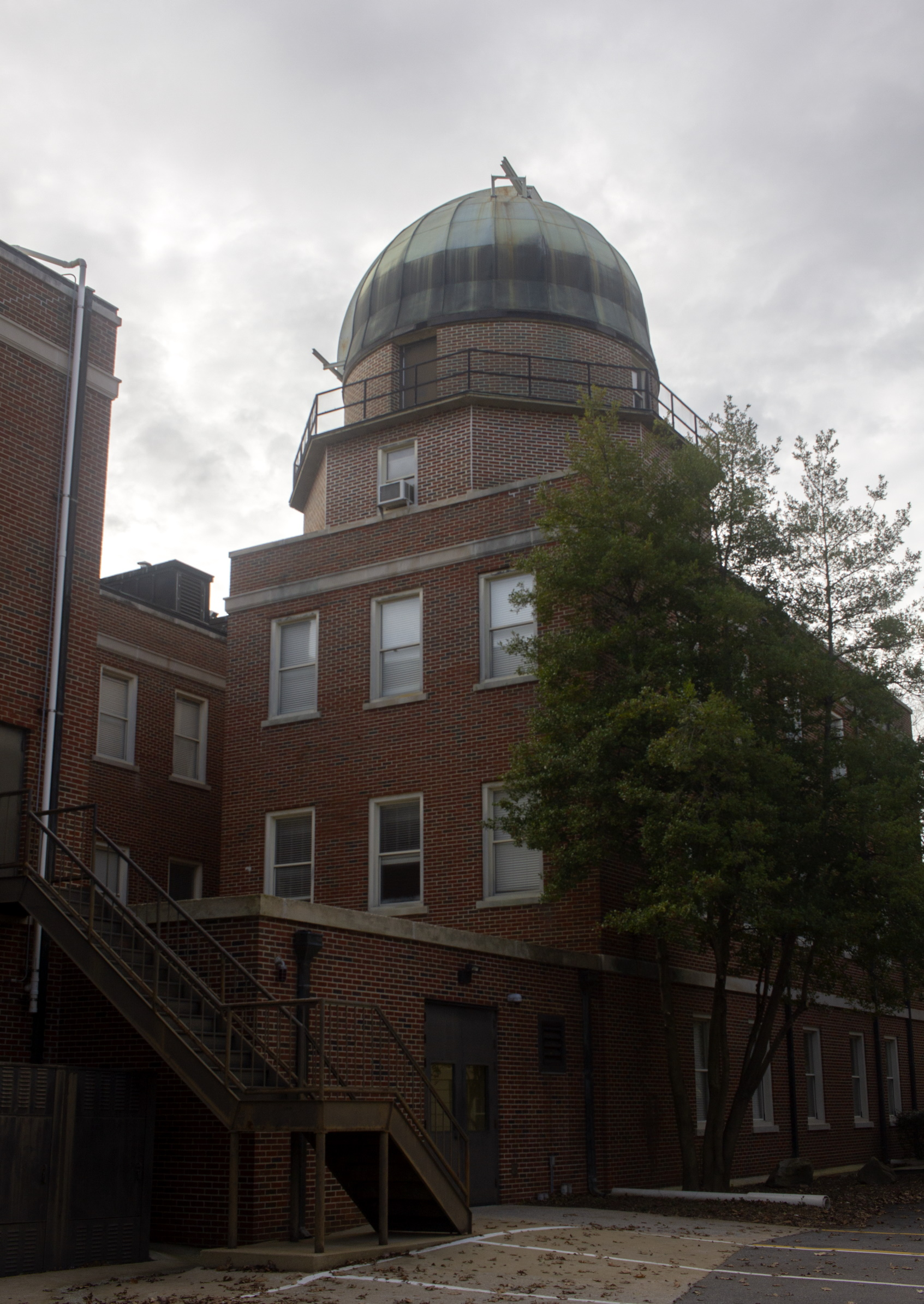
- Organization: University of Alabama
- Location: Tuscaloosa, Alabama, United States
- Coordinates: 33.209682°N 87.543886°W
- Established: 1950
- Website: University of Alabama Astronomy Program

Telescopes
- Unnamed: J.W. Fecker, Inc. 10 in (250 mm) refractor
- Unnamed: DFM Engineering 16 in (410 mm) Ritchey-Chrétien reflector
- Related media on Commons

The University of Alabama Observatory is an astronomical observatory owned and operated by the University of Alabama in Tuscaloosa, Alabama. The new domed observatory was built atop Gallalee Hall, completed in 1949. It replaced the Old Observatory, which had been in use from 1849 until the 1890s. Initially equipped with a 10-inch (0.25 m) refracting telescope, this was the university's primary telescope from 1950 until 2004. The old telescope was removed and then sold to an antique telescope collector to make way for the new instrument. A new 16-inch (0.41 m) Ritchey-Chrétien reflector, manufactured by DFM Engineering, was installed in 2005.

The observatory and its instruments are made available for free public viewing one night per month, weather permitting. The schedule for public viewing is available on the observatory's official website and is updated on a semesterly basis.

== See also ==
- Old University of Alabama Observatory
- List of observatories
