= Gorgas machine gun =

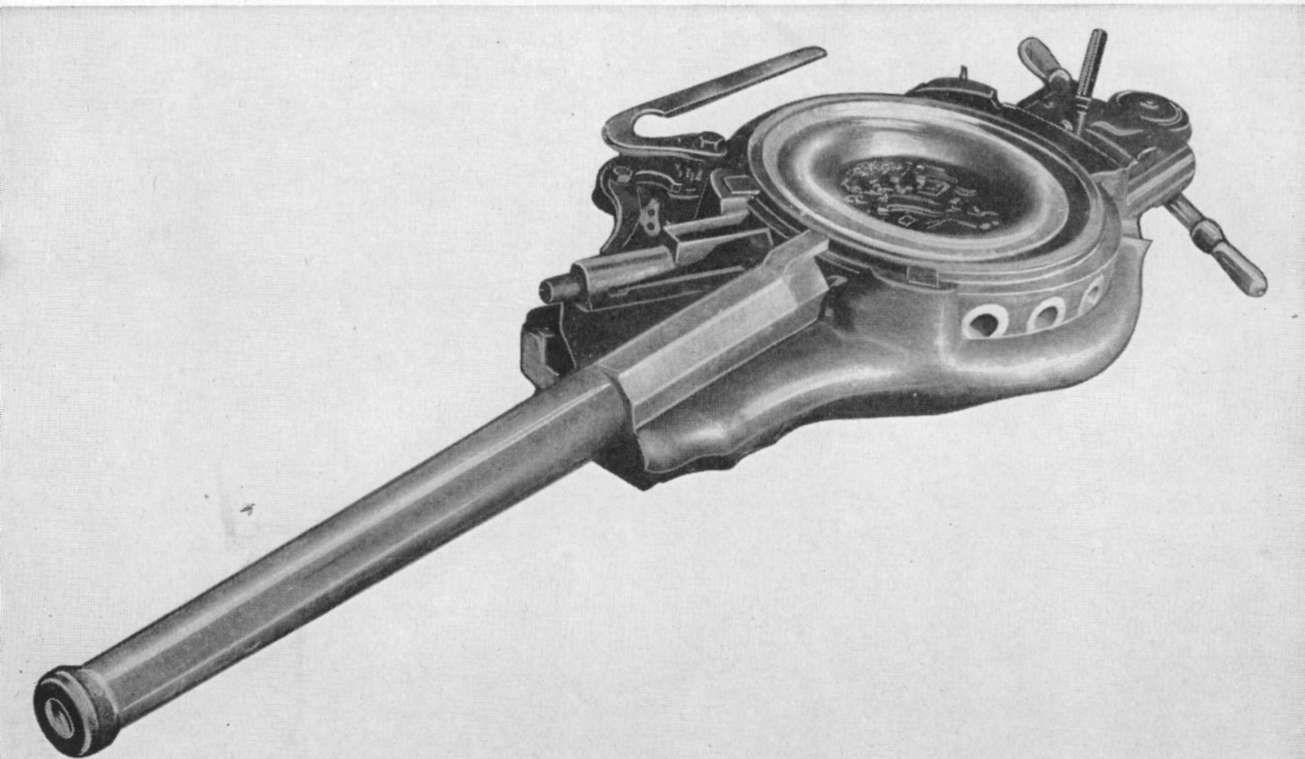
- Type: Machine gun
- Place of origin: Confederate States of America

Specifications
- Action: Crank Handle
- Sights: Iron

The Gorgas machine gun (or sometimes just a Gorgas gun) was a manually cranked prototype machine gun, the creation of Confederate States General Josiah Gorgas.

It had a single 1 1/4-inch-caliber (32 mm) smooth-bore barrel. The barrel was fed from a revolver-like ring, but with an axis of rotation perpendicular to the bore, rather than the usual revolver configuration with parallel axes. The cylinder housed 18 copper-lined chambers that were muzzle loaded from the outer side of the ring. The interior side of the multiple-chamber ring was lined with the corresponding 18 percussion cap nipples. The ring was rotated by a hand lever. The gun had a cast iron receiver.

The sole exemplar built was not used in combat, not having been sufficiently perfected.

== See also ==
- Agar gun
- Centrifugal gun
- Confederate Revolving Cannon
- Gatling gun
- Puckle gun
- Revolver cannon
