= Amelia Gayle Gorgas =

American librarian and postmaster (1826–1913)

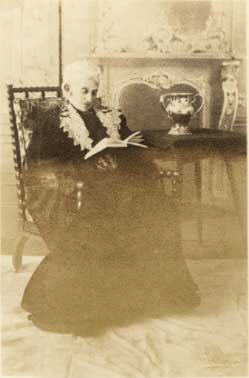
- Amelia Gayle Gorgas in her later years
- Born: Amelia Gayle; June 1, 1826; Greensboro, Alabama, U.S.
- Died: January 3, 1913; University of Alabama
- Occupations: academic librarian; postmaster

Amelia Gayle Gorgas (June 1, 1826 – January 3, 1913) was librarian and postmaster of the University of Alabama for 25 years until her retirement at the age of eighty in 1907. She expanded the library from 6,000 to 20,000 volumes. The primary library at the university is named after her. A native of Greensboro, Alabama, Amelia was the daughter of Alabama governor John Gayle, the wife of Pennsylvania-born Confederate general Josiah Gorgas and the mother of Surgeon General William C. Gorgas. She was inducted into the Alabama Women's Hall of Fame in 1977.

== Early life and education ==
Amelia Gayle was born June 1, 1826, at Greensboro, Alabama. Her parents were Gov. John and Sarah Ann Haynsworth Gayle.

She was educated by governesses and at Columbia female institute, Columbia, Tennessee, graduating in 1842, with highest honors. She spent four years of her girlhood in Tuscaloosa, Alabama, while her father was governor of the State, afterwards removed to Mobile, Alabama where she grew to adulthood and spent the years of her father's term in congress in Washington, D.C.

== Career ==
While in Washington, she enjoyed the unusual privilege of association with the celebrities of the time. Among her most prominent friends was John C. Calhoun. She was frequently a visitor at the White House and was, through the courtesy of Mr. Calhoun, one of the two women on the platform during the laying of the cornerstone of the Washington Monument.

After her marriage to General Gorgas, she accompanied him to the numerous places where he was stationed as a U. S. army officer. During the American Civil War, she made her home in Richmond, Virginia, and after the war, they removed to Briarfield. The next ten years were spent in Sewanee, Tennessee, where she was noted for her hospitality. In 1878, they came to Tuscaloosa upon the appointment of General Gorgas as president of the University of Alabama.

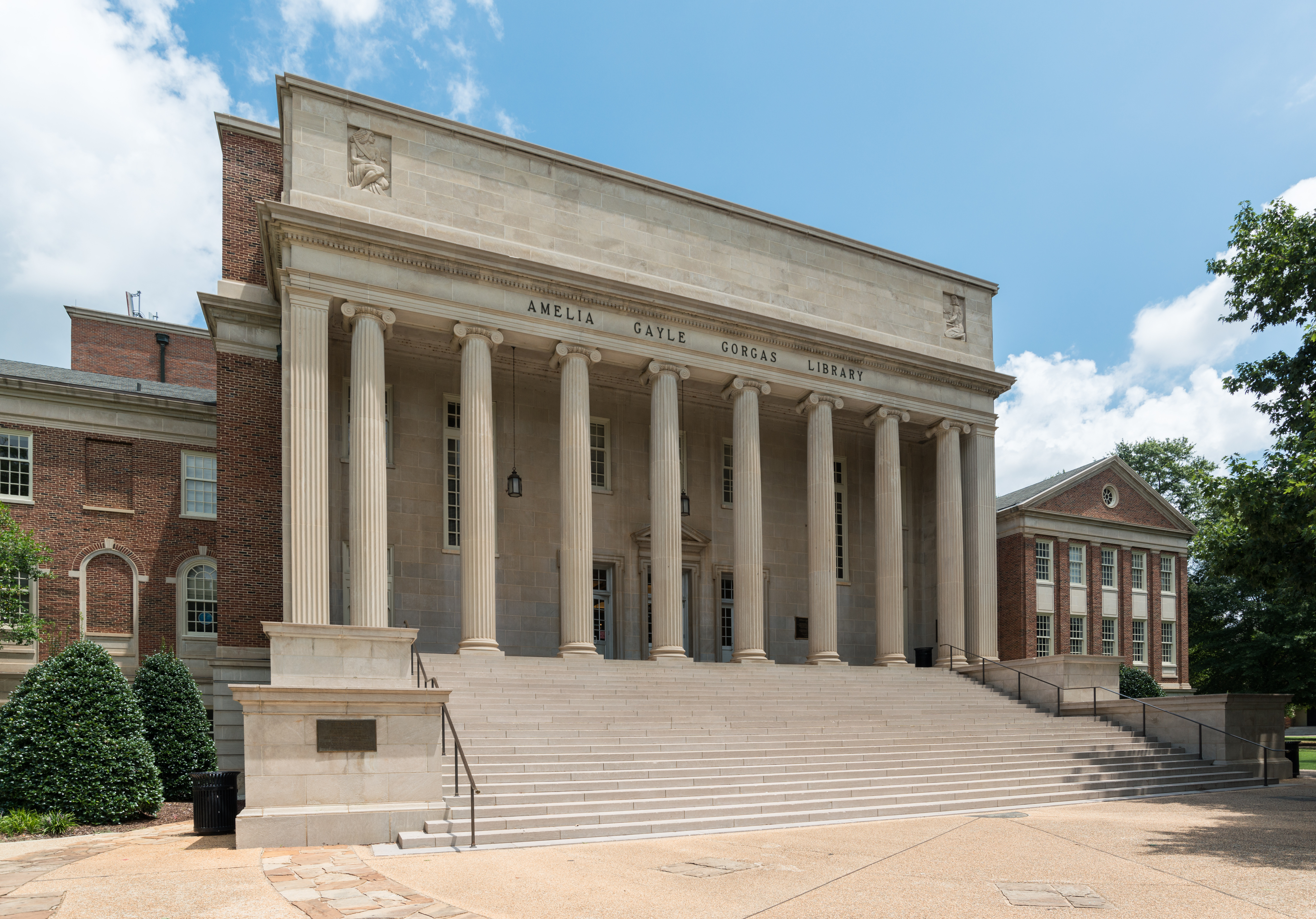
Amelia Gayle Gorgas Library

Mrs. Gorgas later assisted her husband in his duties as librarian and in 1883, at his death, she succeeded him. She held this position until 1906, when she was granted a retiring allowance by the Carnegie foundation. It was in this position her greatest influence was felt. Upon her retirement from active work, was presented a cup by the alumni.

== Personal life ==
On December 29, 1853, at Mobile, she married General Josiah Gorgas. Their children were: William Crawford, Jessie, Mary Gayle, Christine, Maria Bayne, and Richard Haynsworth.

Amelia Gayle Gorgas died January 3, 1913, at the University of Alabama.
