= Josiah Gorgas =

Confederate Army general (1818–1883)

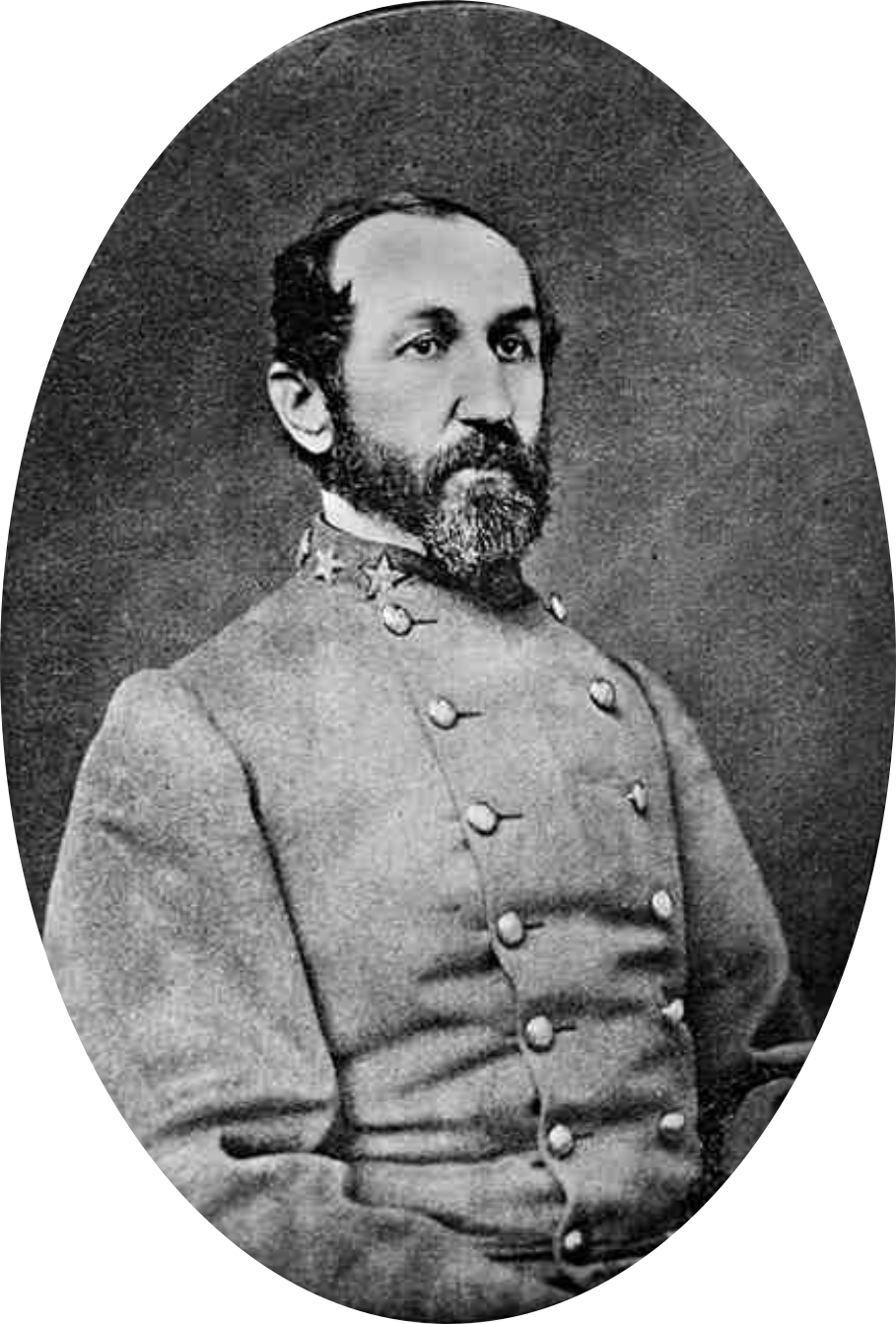
- Born: July 1, 1818 near Elizabethtown, Pennsylvania, US
- Died: May 15, 1883 (aged 64); Tuscaloosa, Alabama, US
- Education: West Point
- Spouse: Amelia Gayle Gorgas
- Children: William C. Gorgas
- Military career
- Allegiance: United States; Confederate States
- Branch: United States Army; Confederate States Army
- Service years: 1841–1861 (USA); 1861–1865 (CSA)
- Rank: Captain (USA); Brigadier general (CSA)
- Conflicts: Mexican–American War; American Civil War
- Other work: University president

Josiah Gorgas (July 1, 1818 – May 15, 1883) was the head of the Confederate States of America Ordance Bureau in the American Civil War, responsible for procuring weapons and ammunition for the Confederate armies; he was a brigadier general at the end of the war. Later, he was president of the University of Alabama.

As chief of ordnance, Gorgas managed to keep the Confederate armies well supplied, despite the Union blockade, and even though the South had hardly any munitions industry – and, indeed, very little industry of any kind – before the war began. In this effort he worked closely with the Fraser, Trenholm shipping company that brought in shipments of ordnance by means of blockade runners. He kept diaries during the war which are now a valuable source of information for historians.

== Early life ==
Josiah Gorgas was born near Elizabethtown in Lancaster County, Pennsylvania. (Note: Gorgas' birthplace is erroneously listed on various websites as "Running Pumps, Pennsylvania". Gorgas was actually born in a house adjacent to the family's cotton factory near the Running Pumps Hotel, just north of Elizabethtown, Lancaster County, Pennsylvania. His father once owned the hotel, but due to financial difficulties had to sell it in 1813, five years before Josiah's birth in 1818.) He graduated from West Point in 1841 and was assigned to the Ordnance Department. He served in the Mexican–American War and was promoted to captain in 1855. In 1853, he married Amelia Gayle, daughter of former Alabama governor John Gayle.

Gorgas served in arsenals in different parts of the country before the Civil War broke out. Early in his career, Gorgas served at Watervliet Arsenal near Troy, New York, and at the Detroit Arsenal. Following the Mexican–American War, Gorgas served in Pennsylvania and in November 1851 was transferred to Fort Monroe in Virginia. There he began his association with the Tredegar Iron Works, which would be the most important Southern foundry during the Civil War. Gorgas went on to serve at the Mount Vernon Arsenal north of Mobile, Alabama beginning in 1853. He was commanding the Frankford Arsenal when he resigned from the United States Army on March 21, 1861 (effective April 3), in order to join the Confederacy.

== Civil War ==
In the years prior to the Civil War, Gorgas was a political opponent of Republicans and abolitionists. He also made requests for transfer to arsenals in the South on multiple occasions. Ultimately his decision to join the Southern secession was apparently motivated as much by professional conflict with his commander as by political principle.

Josiah Gorgas arrived at Confederate first capital, Montgomery, in April 1861 to lead the C.S. Ordnance Bureau, confronting the urgent problem of arming a new nation that possessed almost no factories, foundries, or stockpiles of military equipment.

Gorgas moved to Richmond and became chief of ordnance for the Confederacy with the rank of major. Having served in nearly every arsenal in the nation he was the perfect choice for the position. In this capacity, he worked to create an armaments industry almost from scratch. The South had no foundry except the Tredegar Iron Works. There were no rifle works except small arsenals in Richmond, and Fayetteville, North Carolina, plus the captured machines from the U.S. arsenal in Harpers Ferry.

Gorgas oversaw the Confederate ordnance system that created and supplied the Macon Arsenal, one of the major facilities he established to keep Southern armies armed despite severe industrial shortages.

In the procurement of arms Gorgas also corresponded with Charles K. Prioleau, who headed Trenholm's Liverpool office, arranging for the shipping of arms and other supplies to the Confederacy. Most of the arms sent to the Confederacy departed from Liverpool. During the summer of 1861, Gorgas stockpiled supplies and prepared his first load of cargo while the Trenholm company procured a suitable ship for the voyage. A 1,200 ton iron-hulled steamer, the Bermuda, was chosen to make the voyage.

Gorgas established armories and foundries and created the Nitre Bureau to search for alternative sources of nitre. He implemented Confederate President Jefferson Davis's wish and helped facilitate the commissioning of George Washington Rains, a North Carolina native and West Point graduate with extensive military service who was working as a Northern industrialist when the war broke out. Rains established the Augusta Powder Works in Augusta, Georgia, which supplied almost all of the powder for the Confederacy. Thanks to his and Rains's efforts, the Southern armies never lacked weapons or gunpowder, though they were short on almost everything else. On November 10, 1864, Gorgas was promoted to brigadier general.

== Postbellum ==
After the war, Gorgas purchased an interest in the Brierfield Furnace in Bibb County, near Ashby in Alabama, which had helped supply the Confederate Naval Ordnance Works in Selma. The other directors appointed him to manage the iron works and he moved his family to the furnace site. Due to high operating and management costs he was forced to lease the iron works after just a couple of years in operation.

In 1870, Gorgas accepted a position as the 2nd vice chancellor of the newly established University of the South in Sewanee, Tennessee. His position there was marked by discord with the board of trustees and the stress of keeping the university financially afloat. A student residence hall built as part of the Sewanee Military Academy was later renamed "Gorgas Hall" in his honor.

In 1878, Gorgas was elected 8th president of the University of Alabama. When he was forced to resign due to ill health, the trustees created the position of librarian for him, the position in which his wife was to succeed him. Upon his resignation as president, the university allowed the Gorgas family to move into the Pratt House, which also housed the campus post office and student hospital. The building had originally been the 1829 dining hall and later converted to a faculty residence in 1847. The building was dedicated as a memorial to the family in 1944, and became a museum now known as the Gorgas House upon the death of the last two surviving Gorgas children in 1953.

== Death and legacy ==
Gorgas died in 1883 in Tuscaloosa, Alabama at the age of 65, and was buried at Evergreen Cemetery. After his death, his widow Amelia succeeded him as the University of Alabama's librarian, serving for 23 years. The main university library is named the Amelia Gayle Gorgas Library in her honor.

The couple's oldest son, William Crawford Gorgas (born 1854) served as Surgeon General of the U.S. Army and is credited with implementing preventive measures against yellow fever and malaria that allowed for the completion of the Panama Canal.

== See also ==
- Blockade runners of the American Civil War
- Gorgas machine gun
- List of American Civil War generals (Confederate)
