= Gorgas–Manly Historic District =

Historic district in Alabama, United States

- Gorgas-Manly Historic District
- U.S. National Register of Historic Places
- U.S. Historic district
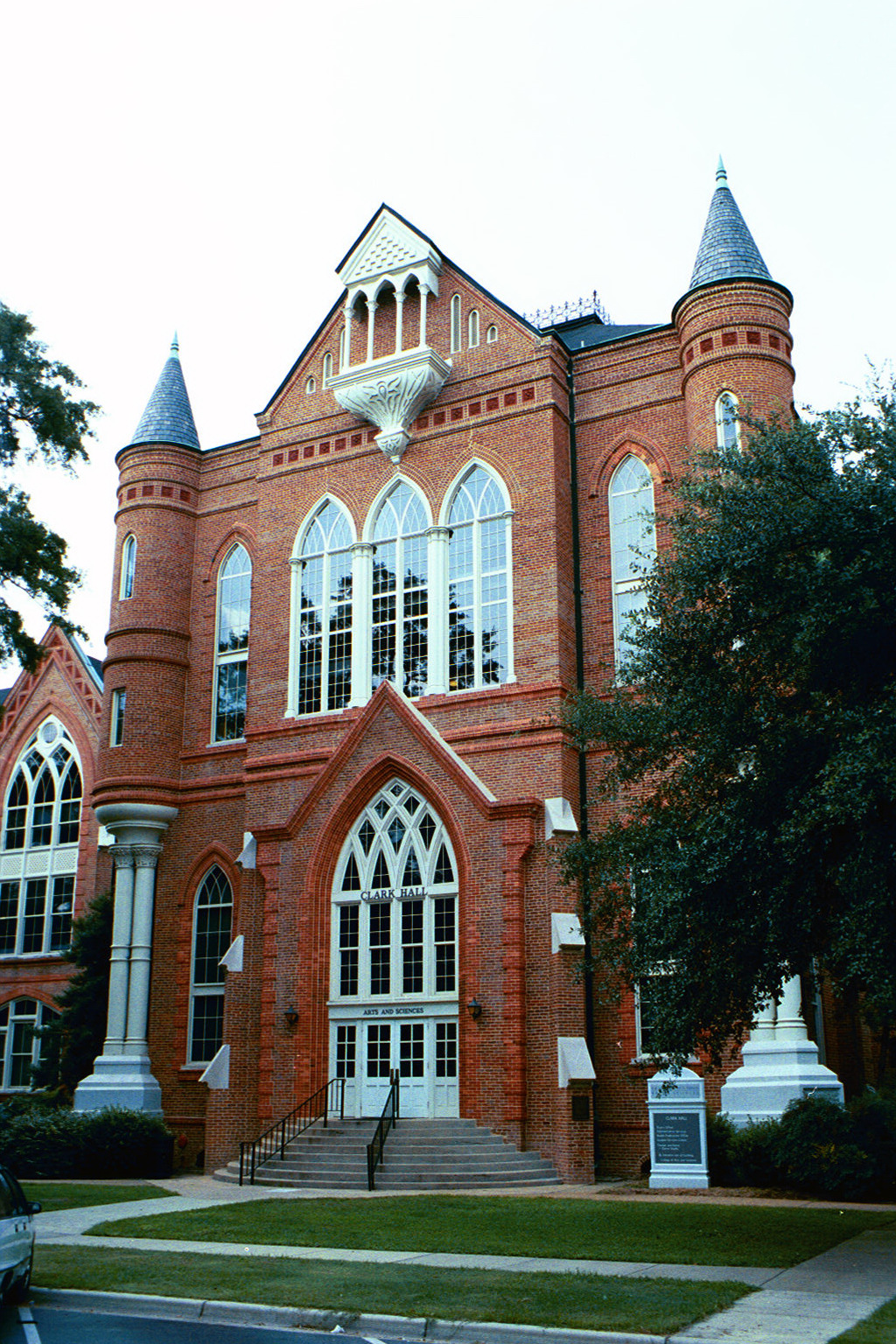
- Clark Hall, completed in 1884.
- Location: Part of the University of Alabama campus Tuscaloosa, Alabama
- Coordinates: 33°12′44″N 87°32′45″W
- Area: 12 acres (4.9 ha)
- Built: 1829-88
- Architect: Multiple
- Architectural style: Federal, Greek Revival, Gothic Revival
- NRHP reference No.: 71000108
- Added to NRHP: July 14, 1971

The Gorgas–Manly Historic District is a historic district that includes 12 acres (4.9 ha) and eight buildings on the campus of the University of Alabama in Tuscaloosa, Alabama. The buildings represent the university campus as it existed from the establishment of the institution through to the late 19th century. Two buildings included in the district, Gorgas House and the Little Round House, are among only seven structures to have survived the burning of the campus by the Union Army, under the command of Brigadier General John T. Croxton, on April 4, 1865. The other survivors were the President's Mansion and the Old Observatory, plus a few faculty residences.

Woods Hall was the first building constructed following the American Civil War. The remaining five buildings, Clark, Manly, Garland, Tuomey and Barnard Halls, represent campus construction during the economic recovery that followed the end of the Reconstruction era.

The construction of Manly, Clark, Garland, and other buildings was financed by the sale of a large portion of 46,800 acres (189 km^{2}) of land given by the United States Congress to the University as repayment "for the fiery ruin brought by Federal troops in 1865."

== The District ==
=== Gorgas House ===
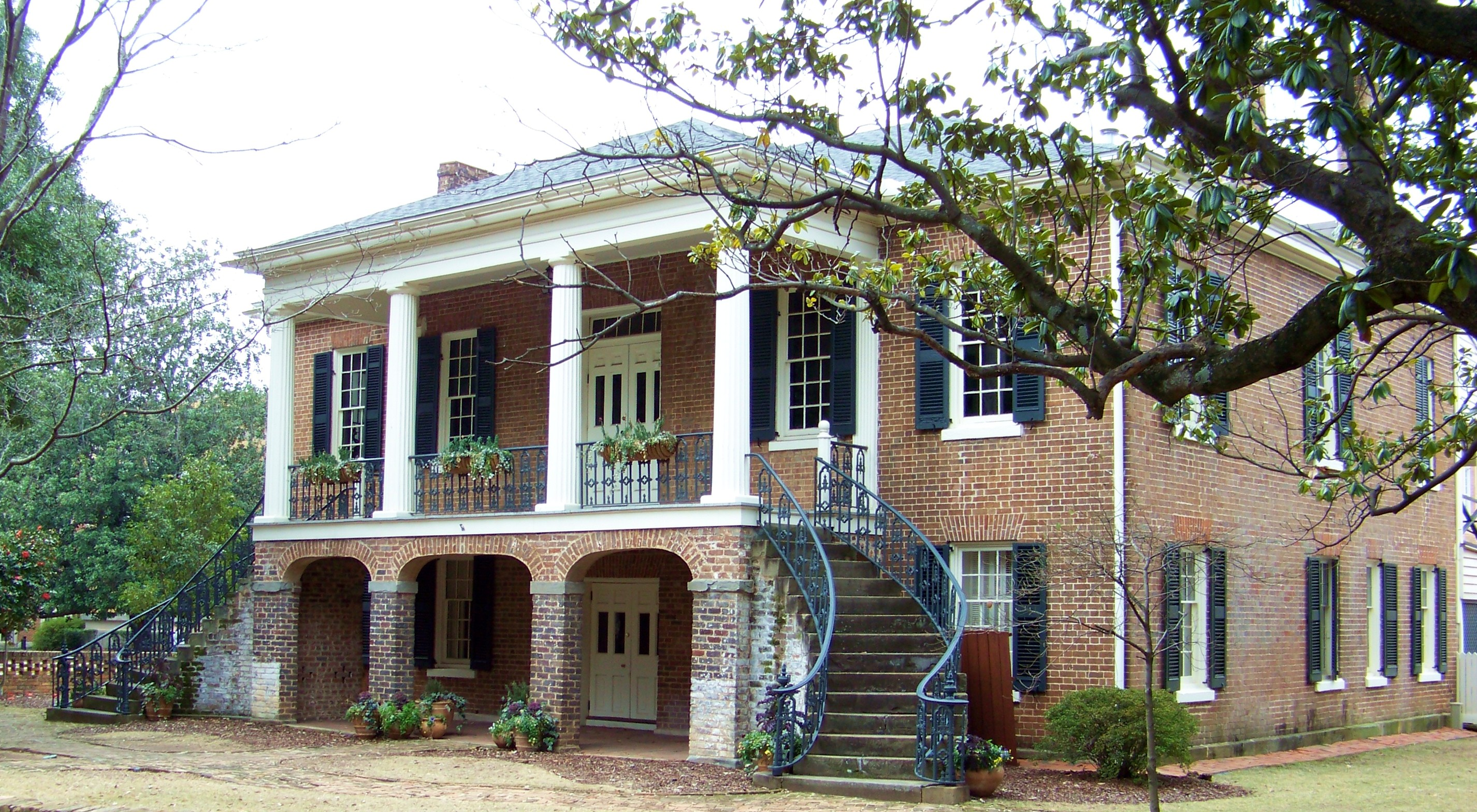
Gorgas House, completed in 1829. The portico was added in 1853 and expanded to its current width in 1896.

An example of the Greek Revival style, the Gorgas House was the first building built on the campus of the university. Designed by William Nichols, designer of the original campus and Tuscaloosa's Old Alabama State Capitol, it was completed in 1829, prior to the opening of the campus. The main facade, minus the portico, reflects the continuing influence of the Federal style. Initially used as a guest house for visitors and professors and as a dining hall for students, it was converted to use as a faculty residence in 1847. The house gained its current name from Josiah Gorgas, the eighth president of the University of Alabama. Ill health forced him to resign as president and the trustees allowed the Gorgas family to move into the house, which also contained the campus post office and student hospital. The building was dedicated as a memorial to the family in 1944 by the Alabama legislature, and then became one of the University of Alabama museums now known as the Gorgas House Museum upon the death of the last two surviving Gorgas children in 1953.

=== Little Round House ===
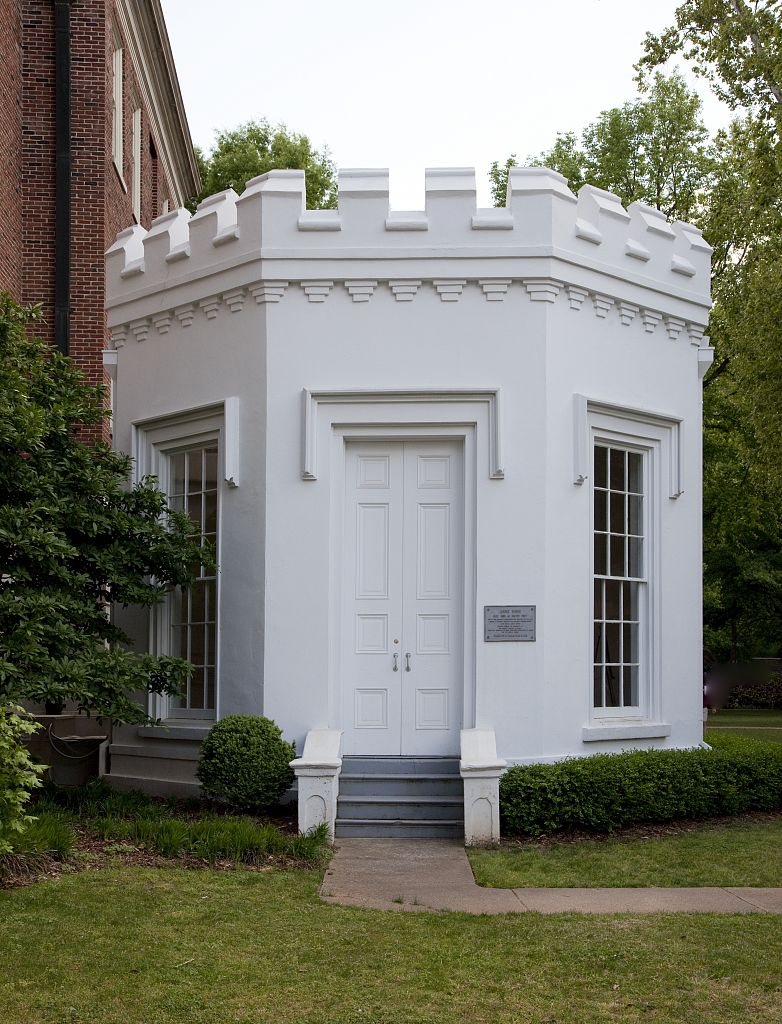
Little Round House, completed in 1860.

This small octagonal building with crenelations originally served as the guard house of the university. It was completed in 1860 during the conversion university into a military campus, intended to be a shelter for sentries from inclement weather. As tensions between the North and South escalated, the request for the transition came from the university president of the time, Landon Cabell Garland. Ironically, the Little Round House, despite its military associations, was one of the few structures that remained after Federal troops burned the campus. When the university reopened its doors in 1871, the building was used as a physician's office. A few years later the building was considered for demolition due to its deteriorated condition. It was saved by the university trustees and converted into a records repository. It became known as Jasons Shrine during the 1930s, while being used by the Jasons, a men's honor society. 1990 saw the structure converted into a memorial for all university honor societies.

=== Woods Hall ===
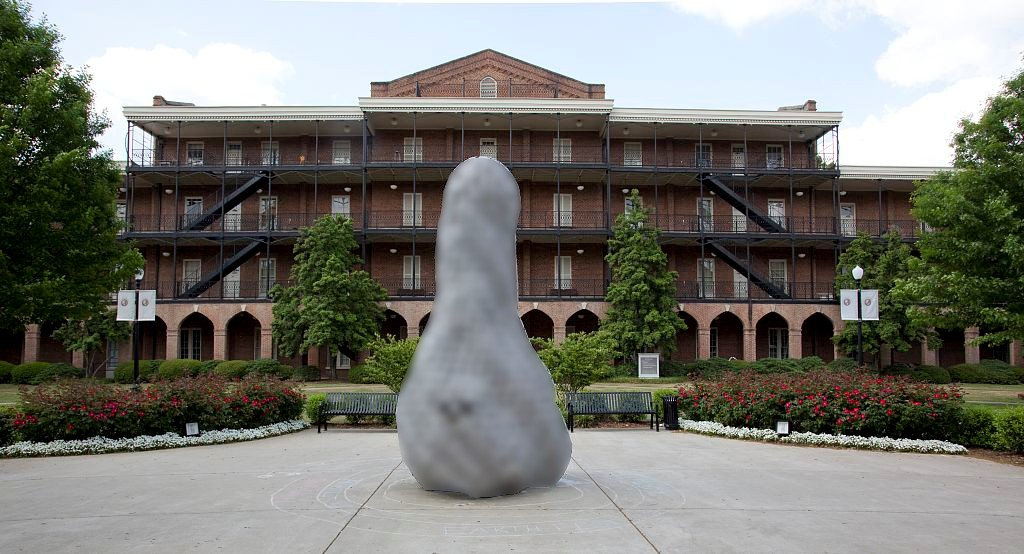
Woods Hall, completed in 1868.

Woods Hall was the first new building on campus following the Civil War. Constructed from 1867 to 1868 out of salvaged bricks from campus buildings destroyed in the war, the four-story brick structure was built with a Gothic Revival arcade on the ground floor, end facades in the Gothic Revival style with a crenelated roof, and cast iron galleries on the central upper floors. Initially known simply as "the barracks," it was used as a dormitory. It also had a dining hall and classrooms on the ground floor. It remained a dormitory until 1961, when it was converted for use by the Department of Art and Art History.

The area between Woods Hall on the one side and Garland, Clark, and Manly on the other side is known as Woods Quad.

=== Clark Hall ===
Built in 1884, the Gothic Revival-style Clark Hall was constructed on the site of the old Lyceum, destroyed during the Civil War. Named for Willis G. Clark, a university trustee, Clark Hall was originally designed as an all-purpose building with a library, reading rooms, chapel, and a large public meeting room, which served as "the great public hall of the University." By 1910 the building was beginning to deteriorate, and by the late 1940s the brick walls were near collapse due to the heavy roof. The hall was preserved by the erection of an interior steel frame within the building. The building was restored again in the 1980s.

Clark Hall contains the main office space for the College of Arts and Sciences, as well as a dance studio (currently overseen by Cornelius Carter).

=== Manly Hall ===
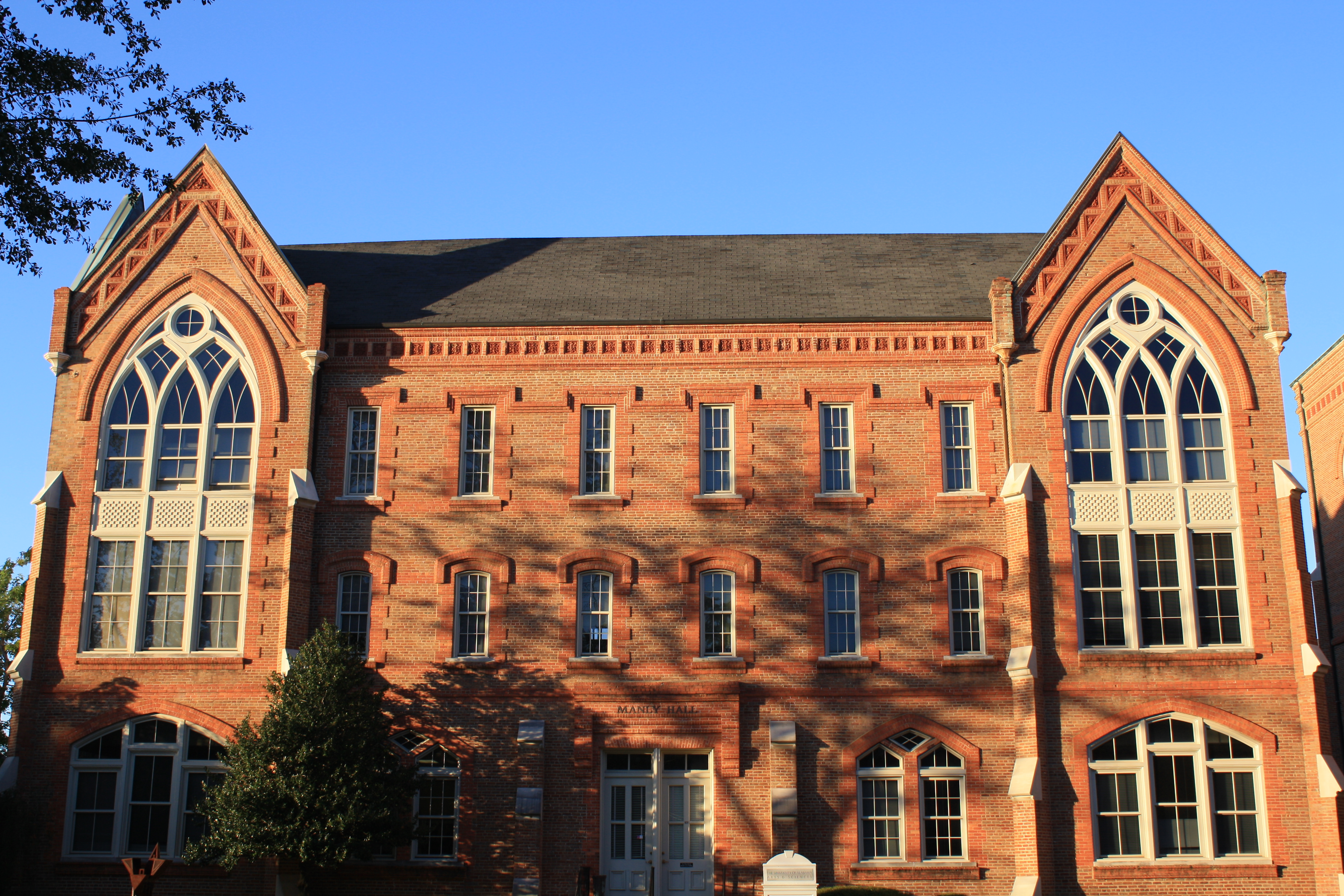
Manly Hall, completed in 1885.

Manly Hall is a 3 1/2-story Gothic Revival structure in red brick. Similar in design to Clark Hall, it was finished in 1885. Originally built as a dormitory, it now houses the Department of Religious Studies, the Department of Women's Studies, the Department of Gender and Race Studies, offices of the English department, and the office of the literary magazine Black Warrior Review. It was named in honor of Basil Manly, the second university president.

=== Garland Hall ===
The three-story Garland Hall is another Gothic Revival–style building on campus, built in 1887 to house a dormitory and the first incarnation of the Alabama Museum of Natural History. It is the "counterpart" of Manly Hall, and today houses the Sarah Moody Gallery of Art. Garland Hall was named for Landon Cabell Garland, the third university president.

=== Tuomey Hall ===
The 2 1/2-story Tuomey Hall, now known as the Blount Undergraduate Initiative Tuomey Academic House, was completed in 1889. Built as a laboratory for the Department of Chemistry, it was named in honor of Michael Tuomey, state geologist and professor. Toumey Hall was previously the home of the Army ROTC at the University of Alabama.

=== Barnard Hall ===
The 2 1/2-story Barnard Hall, now known as Oliver-Barnard Hall, was completed in 1889. Built as a laboratory and gymnasium, it now houses offices and classrooms for the College of Arts and Sciences. It was named for scientist and professor, Frederick A. P. Barnard. It was rededicated as Oliver-Barnard Hall in 2000 in honor of John T. Oliver Jr., trustee emeritus. Barnard Hall was previously the home of the Air Force ROTC at the University of Alabama.

== History With Slavery ==
=== Gorgas House ===
Enslaved people worked in the Gorgas House from its opening, from helping in its construction to staffing the kitchen and dining areas during its use as the Campus Dining Hall. Enslaved workers endured repeated harassment and threats of violence from students, ultimately resulting in the students losing use of the building as a dining hall. Enslaved people continued to work in the building up until the destruction of the campus during the Civil War.

=== Little Round House ===
Shortly after its construction as shelter for university sentries, the Round House was converted into headquarters for the university Drum Corps. The Drum Corps consisted of slaves rented from local residents. The members of the Drum Corps, Neal, Gabe, and Crawford (Crawford replacing Neal in 1864), provided music and assistance with military drills during the university’s time as a military institution. Neal and Crawford were the first to alert the cadets when Union forces approached the university in 1865.

=== Woods Hall ===
Woods Hall, built after the destruction of campus in 1867, was named after Alva Woods, the first president of the University of Alabama. Under his administration, the university began its first significant usage of enslaved people on campus.

=== Manly Hall ===
Manly Hall is named for the second and longest-serving university president, Reverend Basil Manly. Manly was a staunch defender of slavery and remained loyal to the Confederacy, giving the prayer at the inauguration of Confederate President Jefferson Davis. He owned a large number of slaves, employing the enslaved workers who constructed the President’s Mansion on campus and renting out other for use on campus.

=== Garland Hall ===
Garland Hall is named for Landon Cabell Garland, the third president of the university.Garland was the final president to own personal slaves, as well as overseeing the renting of Neal, Crawford, and Gabe, the slaves making up the University Drum Corps.

== See also ==
- National Register of Historic Places listings in Tuscaloosa County, Alabama
