= Igor Serafimovich Tashlykov =

Soviet and Belarusian physicist

- Игорь Серафимович Ташлыков
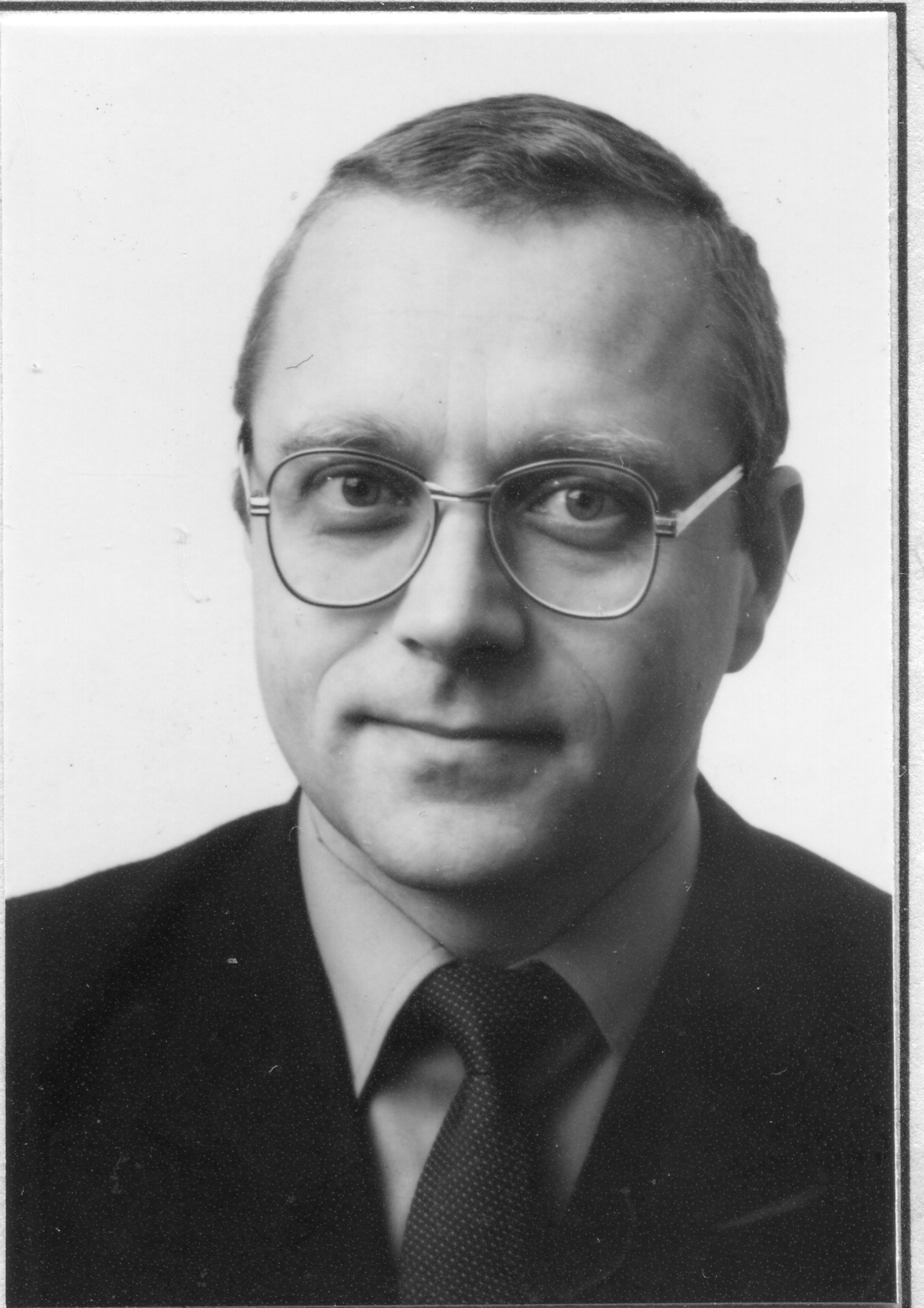
- Born: June 4, 1946; Kanko, Democratic People's Republic of Korea
- Died: June 7, 2016 (aged 70); Minsk, Republic of Belarus
- Citizenship: USSR, Republic of Belarus
- Education: Belarusian State University named after V.I. Lenin
- Known for: Research in the field of radiation material science
- Spouse: Inessa Dmitrievna Tashlykova (Pakhomova) (1946)
- Children: Iya Igorevna Tashlykova-Bushkevich (Tashlykova) (1975)
- Scientific career
- Fields: condensed matter physics, radiation effects in matter, ion implantation in solids
- Workplaces: Belarusian State University named after V.I. Lenin; Belarusian Technological University; Maxim Tank Belarusian State Pedagogical University
- Doctoral advisors: G.A. Humansky, V.I. Prokoshin

Signature
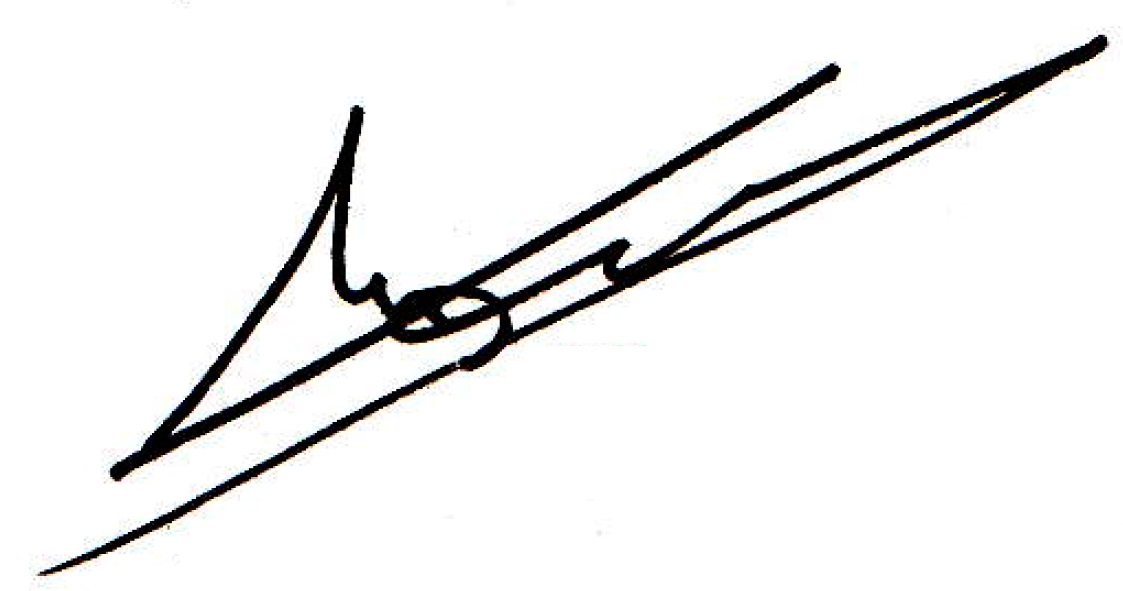

Igor Serafimovich Tashlykov (June 4, 1946 – June 7, 2016) was a Soviet and Belarusian physicist, who was awarded the Doctor of Physical and Mathematical Sciences degree (1989). He was a member of the Belarusian Physical Society (1995). He carried out research at the Research Institute of Applied Physical Problems (APP) of the Belarusian State University (1972-1989 - Senior Researcher), the Belarusian State Technological University (1989-2003 - Professor), the Maxim Tank Belarusian State Pedagogical University (BSPU) (2003-2007 - Dean of the Faculty of Physics; 2007-2013 - Head of the Department of General Physics; 2013-2016 - Professor of Physics and Methods of Teaching Physics).

Tashlykov was an expert in the field of the surface modification of solids using ion-beam technologies. In solid-state electronics, he developed criteria for controlling the transformation of the structure of ion-implanted gallium arsenide and silicon that were based on calculations of the energy density released in the elastic processes of cascade collisions of atomic nuclei. He also developed methods for modifying solids by atomic mixing and ion-assisted deposition of coatings. Tashlykov developed the theory for, and carried out experimental studies in connection with, the ion-assisted deposition of thin films.

Tashlykov received an Award from the President of Belarus for outstanding contributions to the social and economic development of the Republic in 2012. He also founded a research group devoted to the study of the physical characteristics and properties of the surfaces of materials such as metals, semiconductors, and elastomers. He was the author of three monographs published in Belarus and in the United States.

== Biography ==
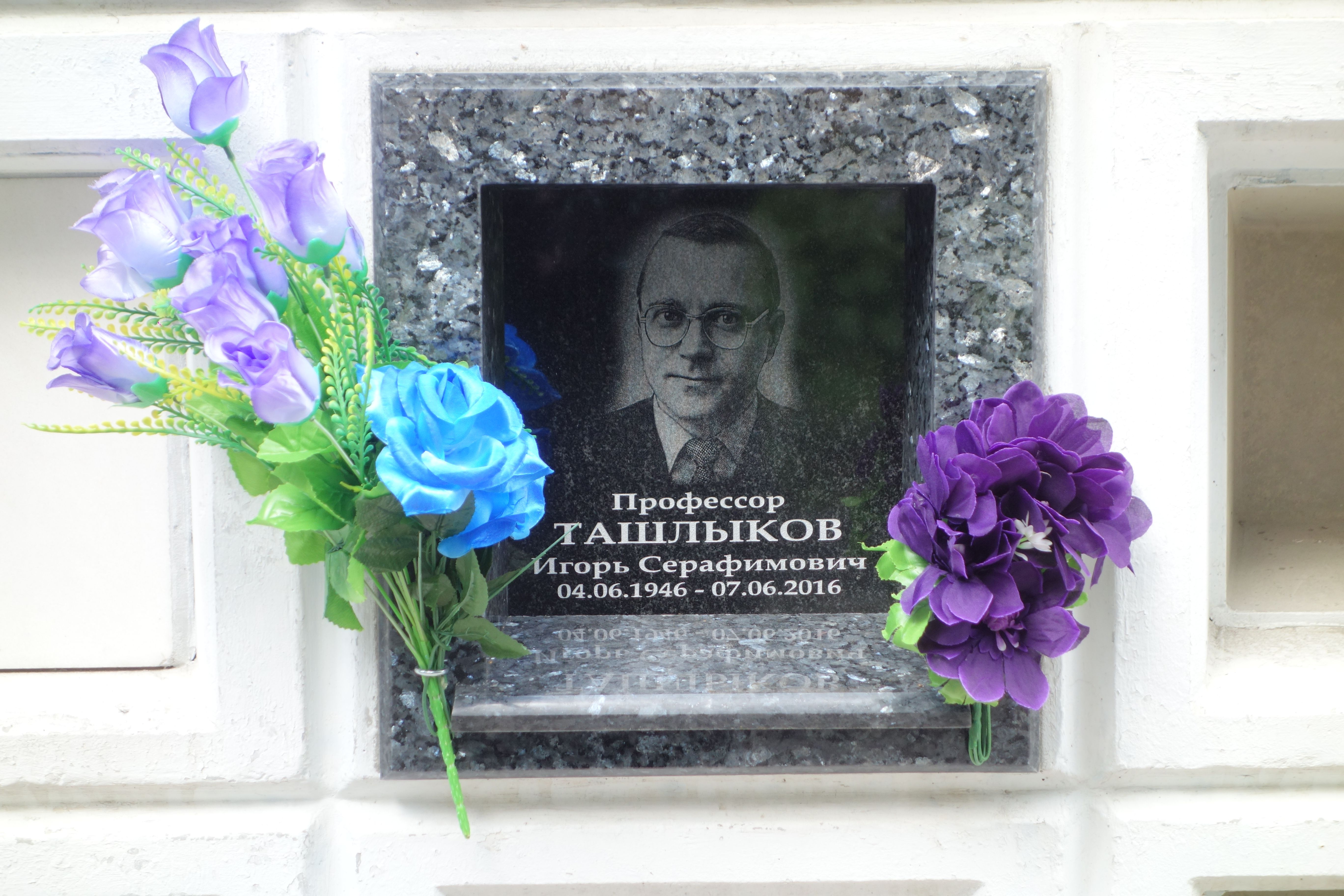
Burial place of Igor S. Tashlykov is the honorary lot No. 114 of the columbarium of the Eastern cemetery in Minsk.

Tashlykov was born in North Korea to Serafim Dmitrievich Tashlykov, a pilot, and Nina Semenovna Tashlykova a nurse, whilst they were stationed there with the Soviet armed forces before he moved to Babruysk in 1952. He moved to Minsk with his parents in 1962 and finished secondary school No. 27 in 1964 with a silver medal before entering the Belarusian State University to study physics, graduating in 1969 with honors from the Physics Faculty with a specialization in solid state physics. He then started full-time postgraduate study before transferring to correspondence postgraduate study in 1970 whilst working as a junior researcher in the laboratory of experimental physics and physical electronics of the BSU. In 1971 he transferred to the Elionics Laboratory within the Research Institute of Applied Physical Problems (APP) at BSU. He became a senior researcher in 1972 and was awarded the degree of Candidate of Sciences in 1973 based on his thesis Investigation of radiation effects in bismuth and its alloys. In 1976 he became a senior research fellow before completing his doctoral thesis on the subject Modification and study of structure in crystals with different types of bonds (Si, GaAs and Ni) by nuclear physical methods at Kharkov State University in 1989.

After receiving his doctoral thesis he worked in the Department of Physics at the Belarusian Institute of Technology, later renamed into the Belarusian Technological University, until 2003, becoming a professor in 1992. In 2003, at the invitation of the rector of the Maxim Tank Belarusian State Pedagogical University, Kukharchik Petr Dmitrievich, he went to work as the Dean of the Physical Faculty. He was Head of the Department of Experimental Physics from 2007 and Professor of the Department of Physics and Methods of Teaching Physics from 2013.

June 7, 2016, died of stroke in Minsk. He was buried in the honorary lot No. 114 of the columbarium of the Eastern (Moscow) cemetery in Minsk.

== Scientific activity ==
Tashlykov was primarily focused on the modification of the structure and properties of solids using ion-beam and ion-plasma methods and technologies. This included the study of physical and chemical processes occurring during the interaction of accelerated ions with elastomers as well as the formation of thin film (coating) / substrate systems.

=== Postgraduate studies ===
Tashlykov began his scientific work by studying radiation defects in bismuth and its alloys in 1969 under the guidance of Georgy Alexandrovich Humansky and Valery Ivanovich Prokoshin. Due to a lack of radiation sources samples were irradiated on a microtron at the Physical Institute of Academy of Sciences (PIAS) of the USSR and a U-120 cyclotron in Kiev at the Institute for Nuclear Research of the Academy of Sciences of the Ukrainian SSR. As a result of successful work Tashlykov was recommended for a one-year internship at the Department of Ionometry of the University of Jena in East Germany in 1971–1972 where he studied protonography and ionometry, later called spectroscopy of Rutherford backscattering (RBS) ions in combination with their channeling. It was later noted that Tashlykov was among the first Soviet scientists who held the years experiments in 1971-1972 using ion channeling for layer-by-layer analysis of radiation damages in single crystals.

These results were the basis for the development of the method of calculating the concentration of radiation defects in irradiated single crystals, using the method of ionometry, taking into account the multiple scattering of channeled helium ions. On September 25, 1973, Tashlykov defended his Ph.D. thesis on "The study of radiation effects in bismuth and its alloys" in the BSU.

=== Work at the Belarusian State University ===
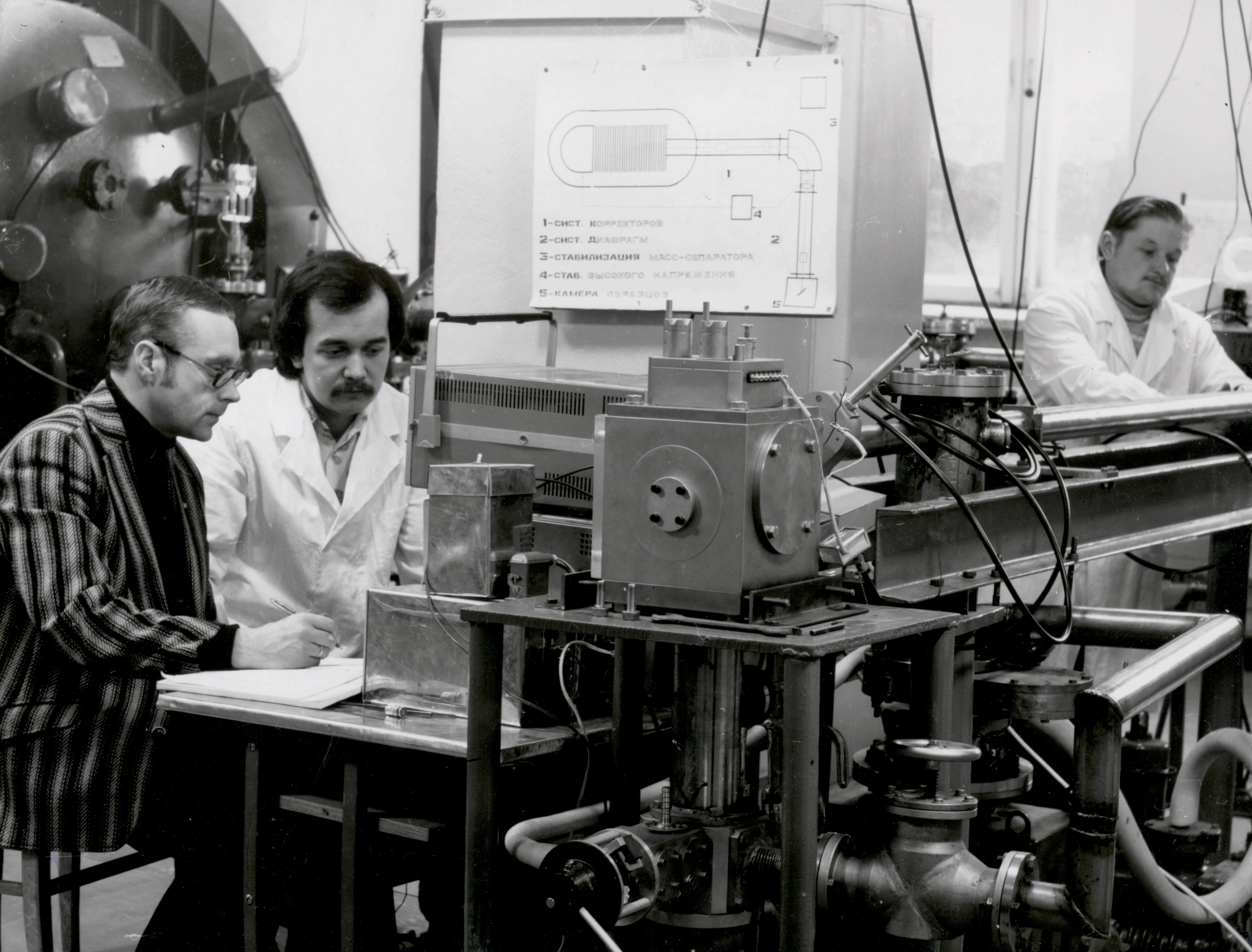
Accelerator ESU-2 in the A.N. Sevchenko Scientific Research Institute of the APP of BSU. Igor Tashlykov, Evgeny Kotov and Alexander Liseenko, Minsk, 1983

At Belarusian State University Tashlykov started studying radiation disturbances in bismuth and its alloys by nuclear physical methods. Tashlykov initiated the creation of a research complex of nuclear physical methods on the basis of the ESU-2 electrostatic accelerator of horizontal type in the Belarusian State University in 1975–1979. This legendary accelerator number 2, built shortly after the World War II in the laboratories of Kharkov Institute of Physics and Technology, was used in the 1960s and 1970s as an electron accelerator at Lebedev Physical Institute. With the assistance of the director of the Research Institute of the APP, Academician of the Academy of Sciences of Belarus, A.N. Sevchenko, head of the semiconductor laboratory Academician, B. M. Vul passed this accelerator to Belarus.

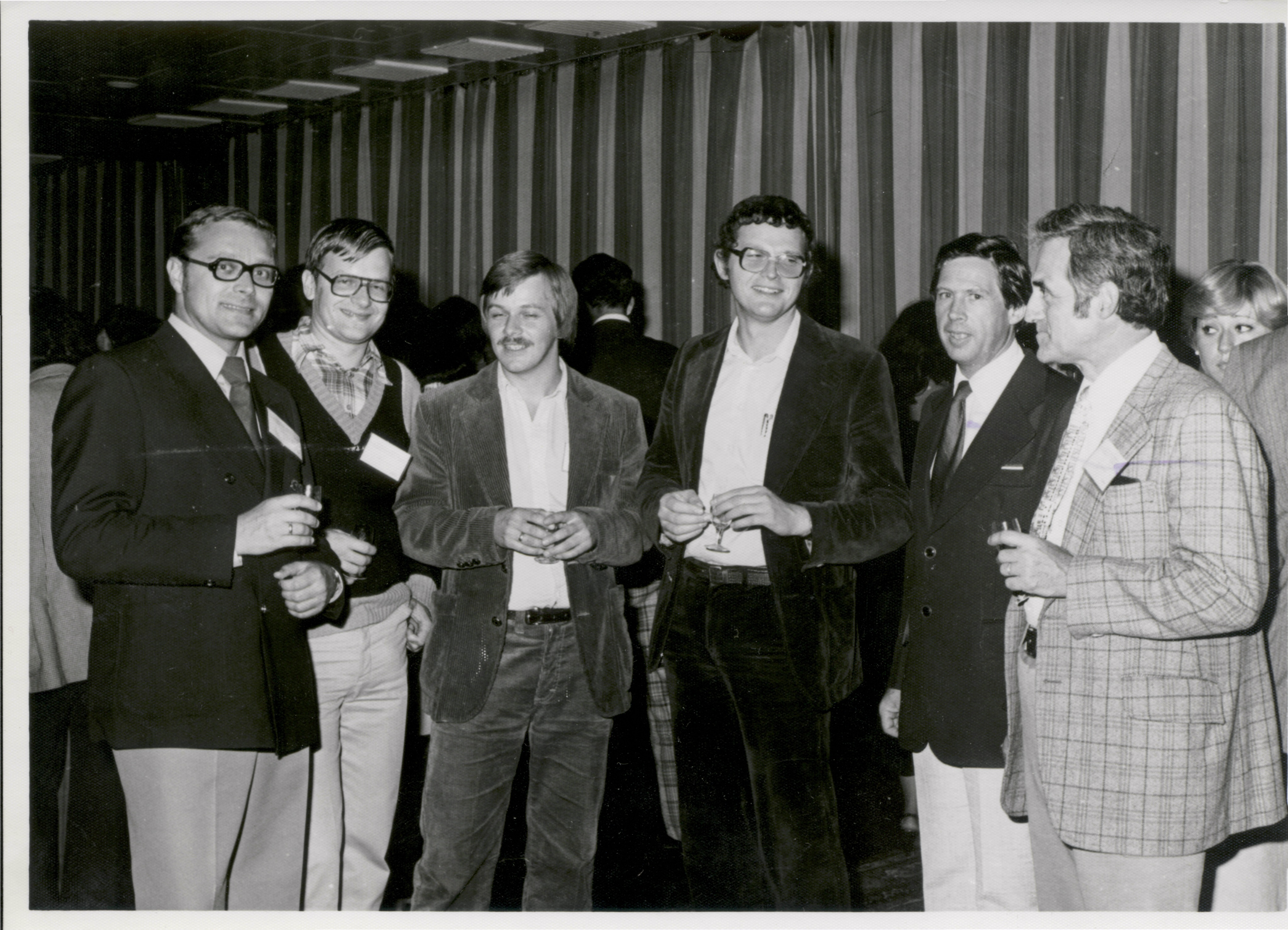
International Conference: Ion Beam Modification of Materials (IBM-78). First on the right John Davies, second - Larry Hou and others, Budapest, Hungary, autumn 1978

Organization of a new research center based on ESU-2, the reconstruction of the accelerator (the creation of a high-frequency ion source and its control systems), the logistic support (transmission of a target chamber equipped with a two-axis precision goniometer) of the elionics laboratory was greatly assisted by well-known specialists: L.I. Pivovar (KPTI), G.M. Osetinsky and I.A. Chepurchenko from the Joint Institute for Nuclear Research (Dubna), as well as Tashlykov's colleague and friend Hardwig Treff of the University of Jena.

From the beginning of the 1970s research work began in the BSU under the guidance of G. A. Gumansky on the tasks identified by the State Committee on Science and Technology of the Council of Ministers of the USSR associated with ion-beam synthesis of double and triple connections of optoelectronics materials. This research led to active international cooperation, in particular carrying out research at the University of Jena in 1971–1972, 1973, 1975, and 1977.

In 1977, at the International Conference on Atomic Collisions in Solids (ICACS) at the Moscow State University, Tashlykov became acquainted with John A. Davies from Chalk River Nuclear Laboratories and George Carter of the University of Salford in Manchester.

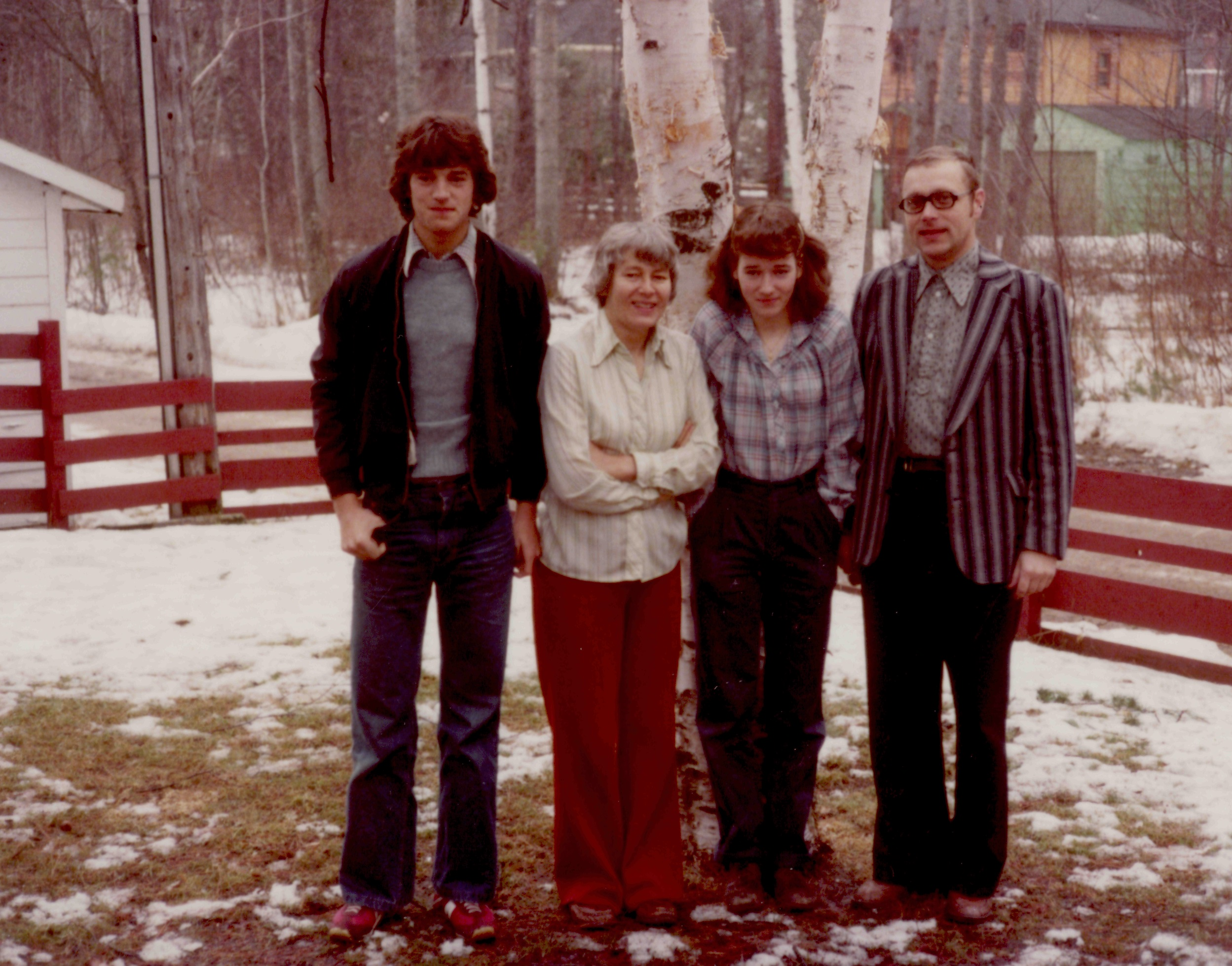
John A. Davies' family – son John, wife Florence, daughter Anne – and Igor Tashlykov, Deep River, Canada, January 1980

In 1979-1980 John A. Davis invited Tashlykov to undertake a traineeship at the McMaster University and the Chalk River Nuclear Laboratories in Canada during which time he studied defect formation in gallium arsenide during implantation of Nitrogen, Aluminium, Phosphorus, Arsenic, and Antimony ions under varied conditions. Using the Rutherford backscattering (RBS), the distribution profiles of the implanted As, Sb were established using the nuclear reaction of aluminum profiles in gallium arsenide. These results, as well as the results of studies of the modification of the catalytic properties of nickel electrodes for water alkaline electrolysis for the production of hydrogen, formed the basis for his doctoral dissertation and additional information was obtained about the mechanisms of formation of radiation damage and phase reconstruction of the structure in gallium arsenide under ion irradiation, the influence of ion current density on these processes, the energy density released in the cascade of atomic collisions, the type of ions, and the irradiation temperature.

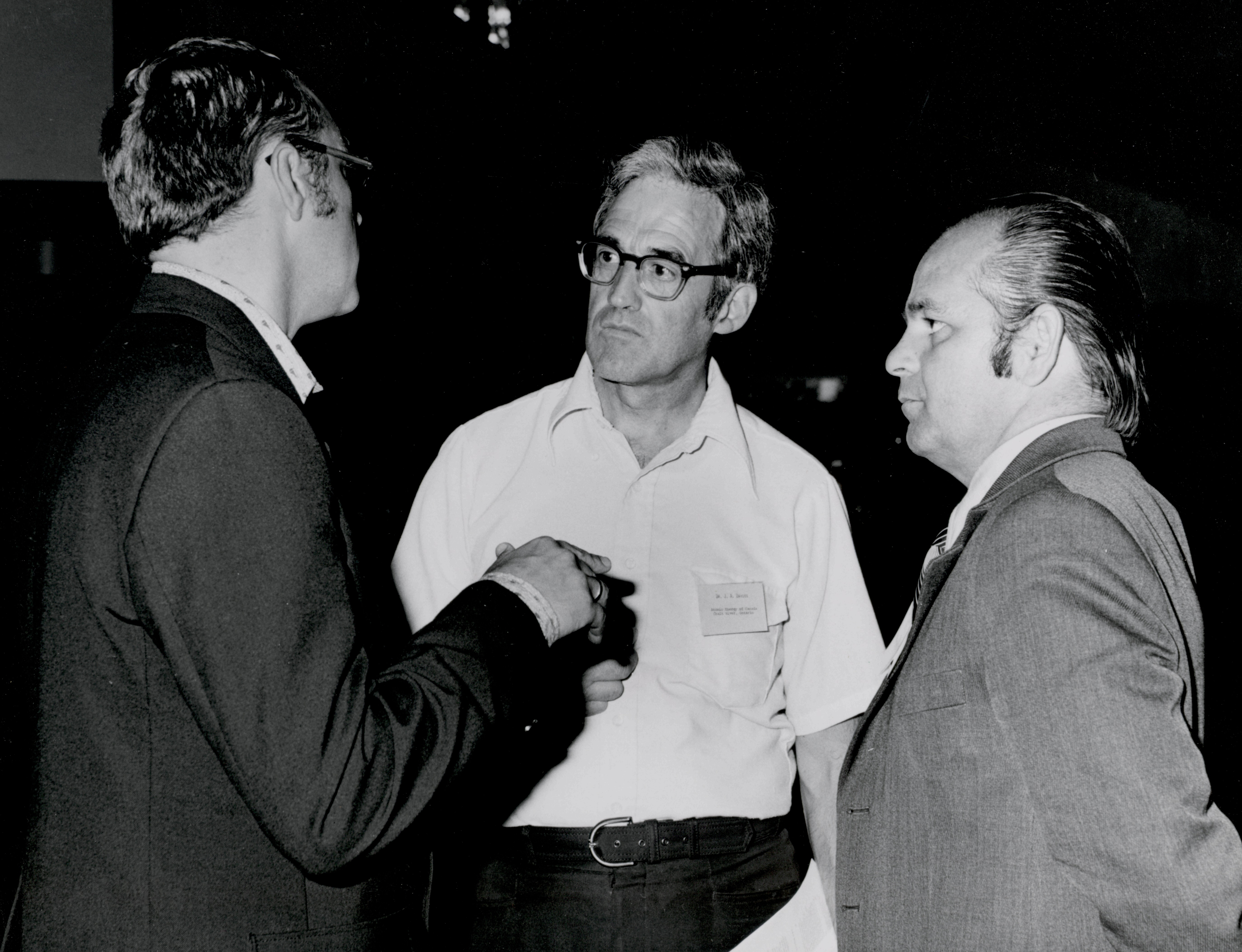
Conference ACS-1979. Igor Tashlykov, John Davies and Muradyn Kumakhov, Hamilton, Canada, August 1979

The results of the studies in Canada of ion implantation into electrodes used in alkali electrolysis for the production of hydrogen and oxygen were reported by Tashlykov at the Kurchatov Institute. In the early 1980s financing was provided to develop technical regulations for ion implantation of metal catalysts and other ions which led to the generation of 5 copyright certificates for creating active and corrosion-resistant electrodes.

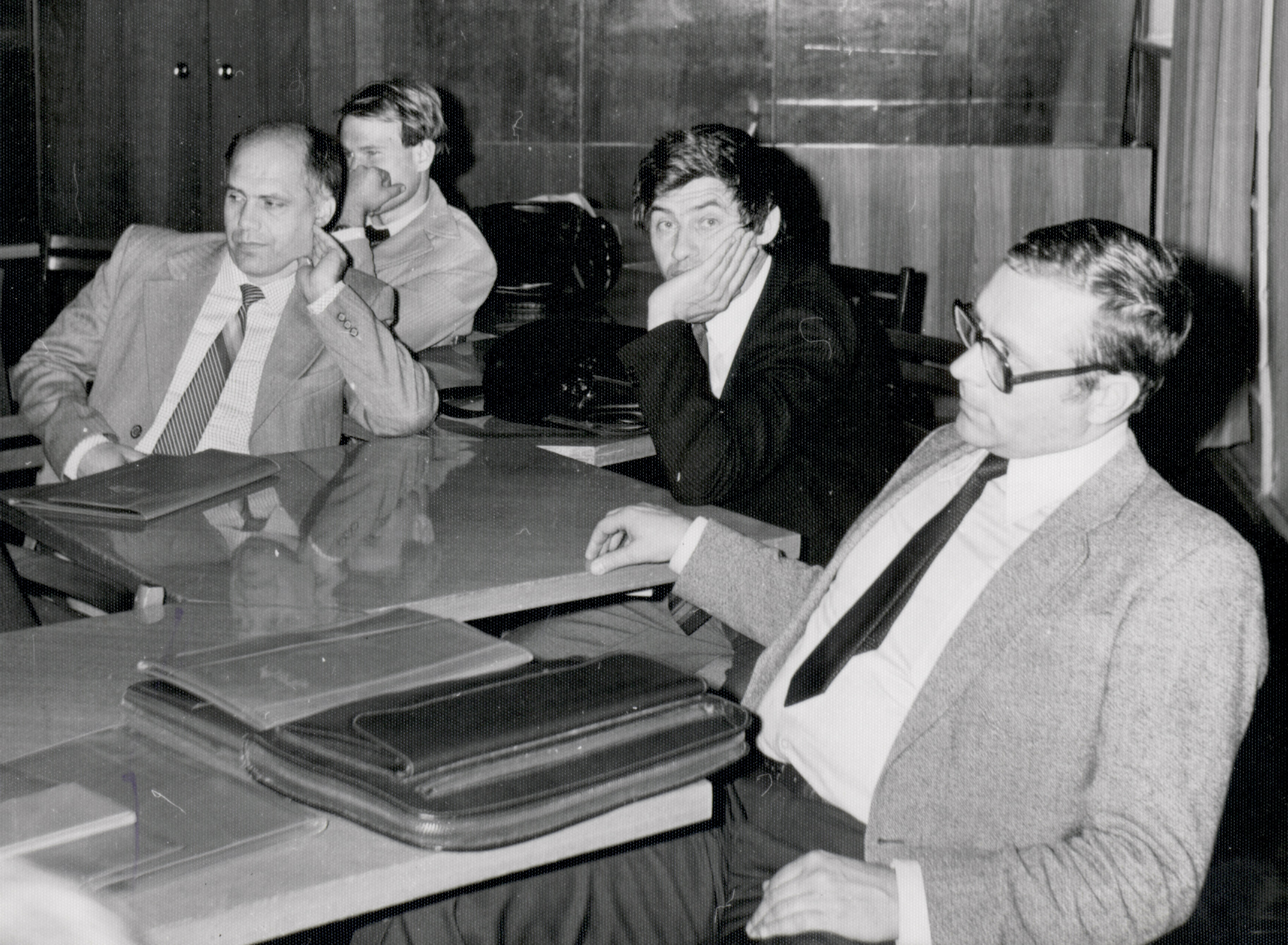
VI Seminar on rapid analysis methods. E.T. Shipatov, V. Molchanov (Donetsk), S.N. Potapov (RSU) and I.S. Tashlykov, Rostov-on-Don, Russia, October 1983

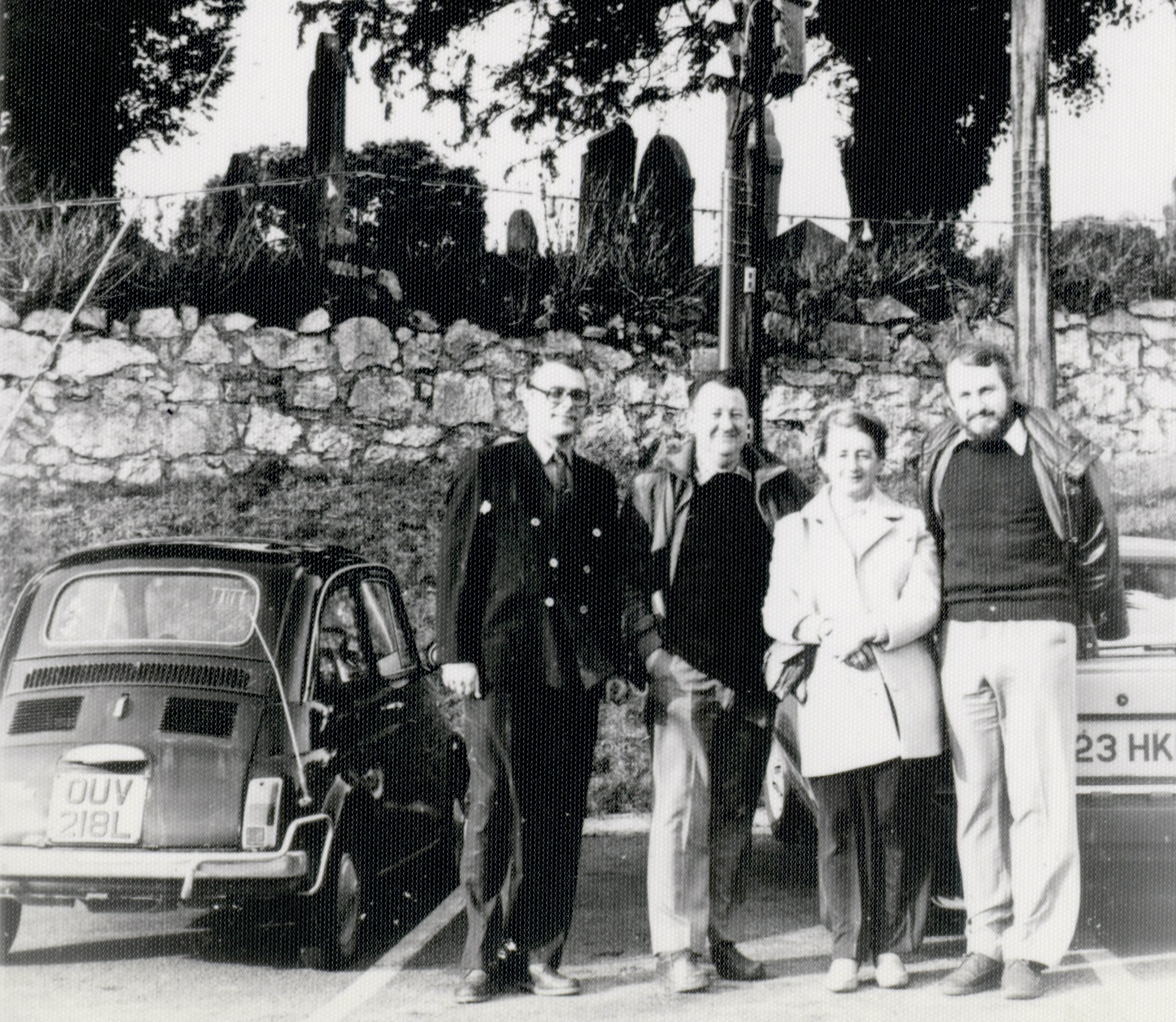
On the way to Conway. Igor Tashlykov, George Carter and Hilda Carter, Igor Bello, United Kingdom, February 1984

Tashlykov was appointed to the Coordination Group on the methods of fast nuclear analysis of the Council of the USSR Academy of Sciences (later the Russian Academy of Sciences) on the application of methods of nuclear physics in related fields and to the Coordination Group of Electrostatic Accelerators in the Council of the Academy of Sciences of the USSR (Section of accelerators of direct action and sources of charged particles) headed by V. A. Romanov (Obninsk Institute of Physics and Power Engineering). At the invitation of Spartak Belyaev he consulted the method of spectroscopy of Rutherford backscattering and ion channeling in the Department of Nuclear Physics of the Institute of Atomic Energy in 1987–1988. The developed regulations for ion-beam synthesis and doping of semiconductor crystals were introduced at the enterprises of the Ministry of Electronics Industry in 1987 and the USSR radio industry in 1988. The regulations for the creation of anodes of catalytically active and corrosion-resistant anodes for water-alkali electrolysis by the implantation of Ag^{+} ions into Ni, the use of which provides for a 10% reduction in energy costs per unit of production, were transferred to the organizations of Ministry of Chemical Industry and the USSR Academy of Sciences. The economic effect amounted to 180 thousand soviet rubles. The invaluable assistance was rendered during this period of research using nuclear-physical methods by the head of the Accelerators Laboratory of the Research Institute of Nuclear Physics of Moscow State University, candidate of physical and mathematical sciences, Laureate of the State Prize of the USSR V.S. Kulikauskas.

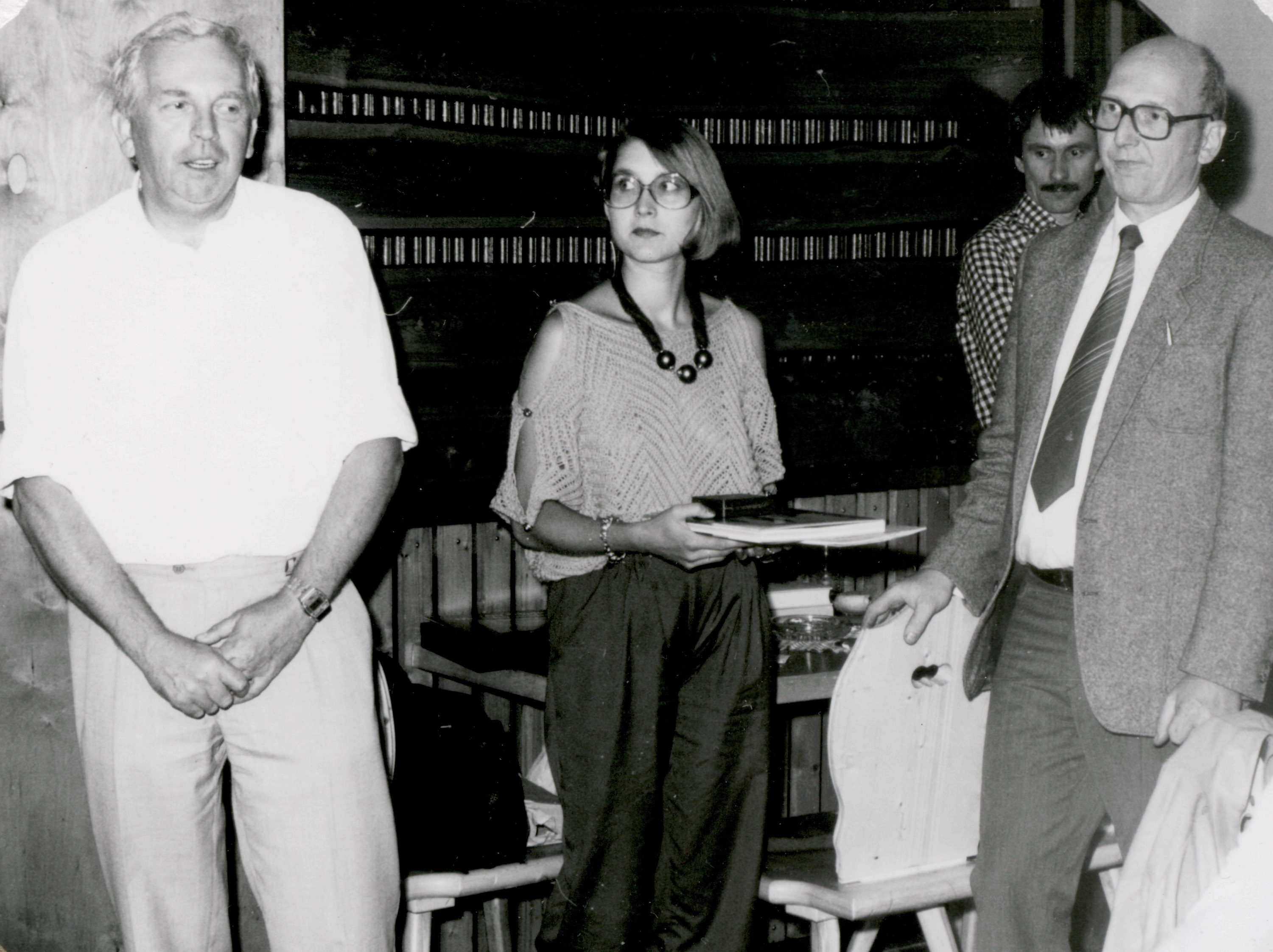
Gerhard Götz, Hardwig Treff, Elke Wendler, Jena, GDR, 1987

In 1982, he led the organization and conduct of the All-Union Seminar on Methods of Instant Nuclear Analysis at the A.N. Sevchenko Scientific Research Institute of the APP of BSU. In 1985 and 1987, he was a scientific secretary of the All-Union schools conducted at the Belarusian State University on ion implantation and emission of channeled ions. In June 1985, Tashlykov organized an invitation of John A. Davis, who delivered lectures in the BSU for Belarusian scientists and microelectronics specialists. In Moscow, John A. Davis met with L. I. Ivanov. from the Institute of Metallurgy named after A.A. Baikov, who was the leader of the USSR part of the Apollo–Soyuz Test Project. Later L.I. Ivanov, being the deputy editor of the scientific journal "Physics and Chemistry of Material Processing", invited Tashlykov to join the editorial board of this journal, where he had worked until 2016.

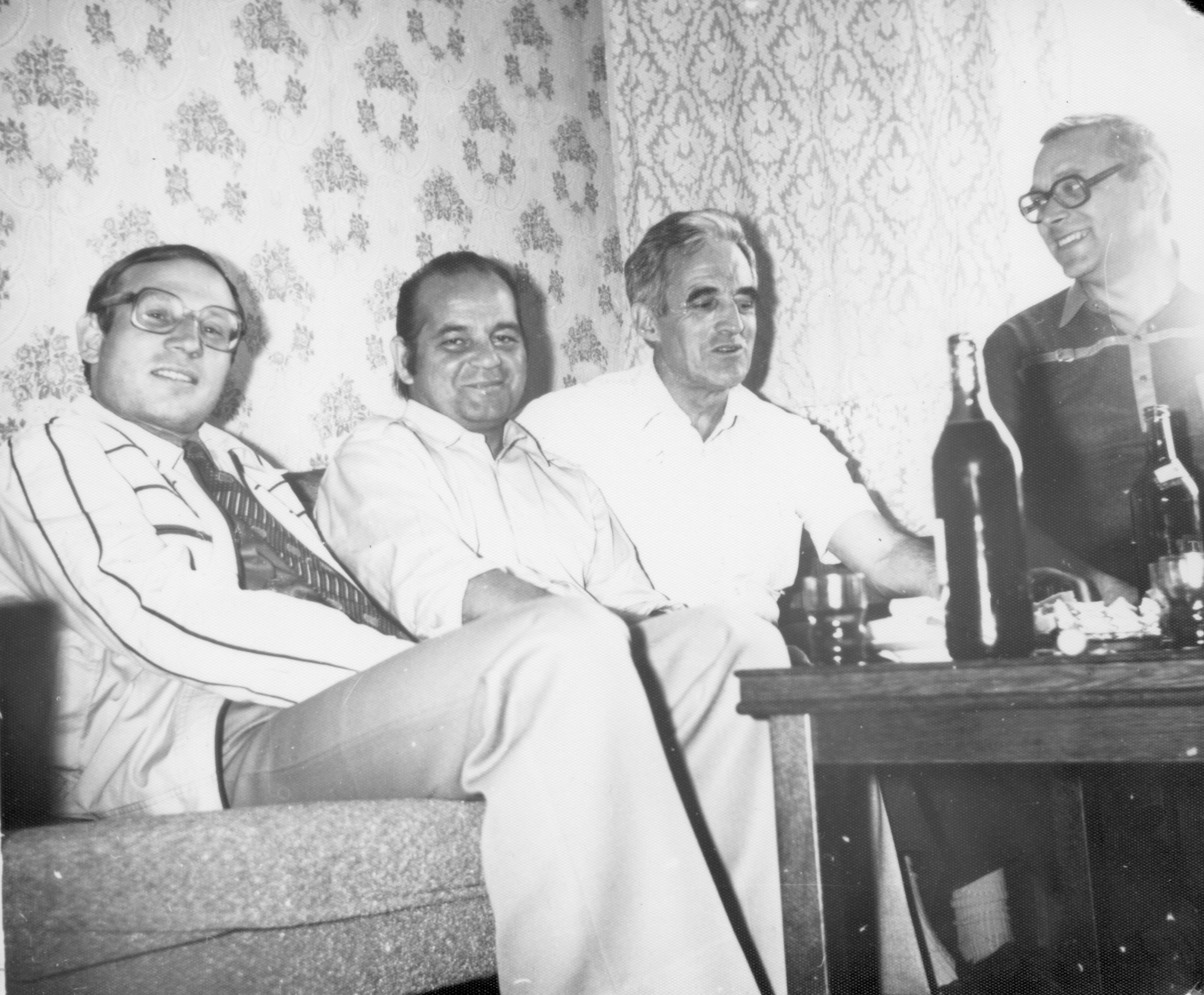
Tea in the hotel "Jubileynaya". Fadey Komarov, Muradyn Kumakhov, John Davies, Igor Tashlykov, Minsk, July 1985

Tashlykov was invited by George Carter to continue the study the mechanisms of defect formation in semiconductors and metals under ion irradiation in the University of Salford in 1984. At the same time, together with John S. Colligon, he conducted experiments to study the effect of the energy density released in the cascade of atomic collisions on the processes of ion-assisted deposition of coatings on materials. In 1985, during a UNESCO trip to West Germany, the studies, started in Belarus and the UK, were continued in collaboration with scientists from Germany at the Heidelberg University and the Max Planck Institute for Nuclear Physics.

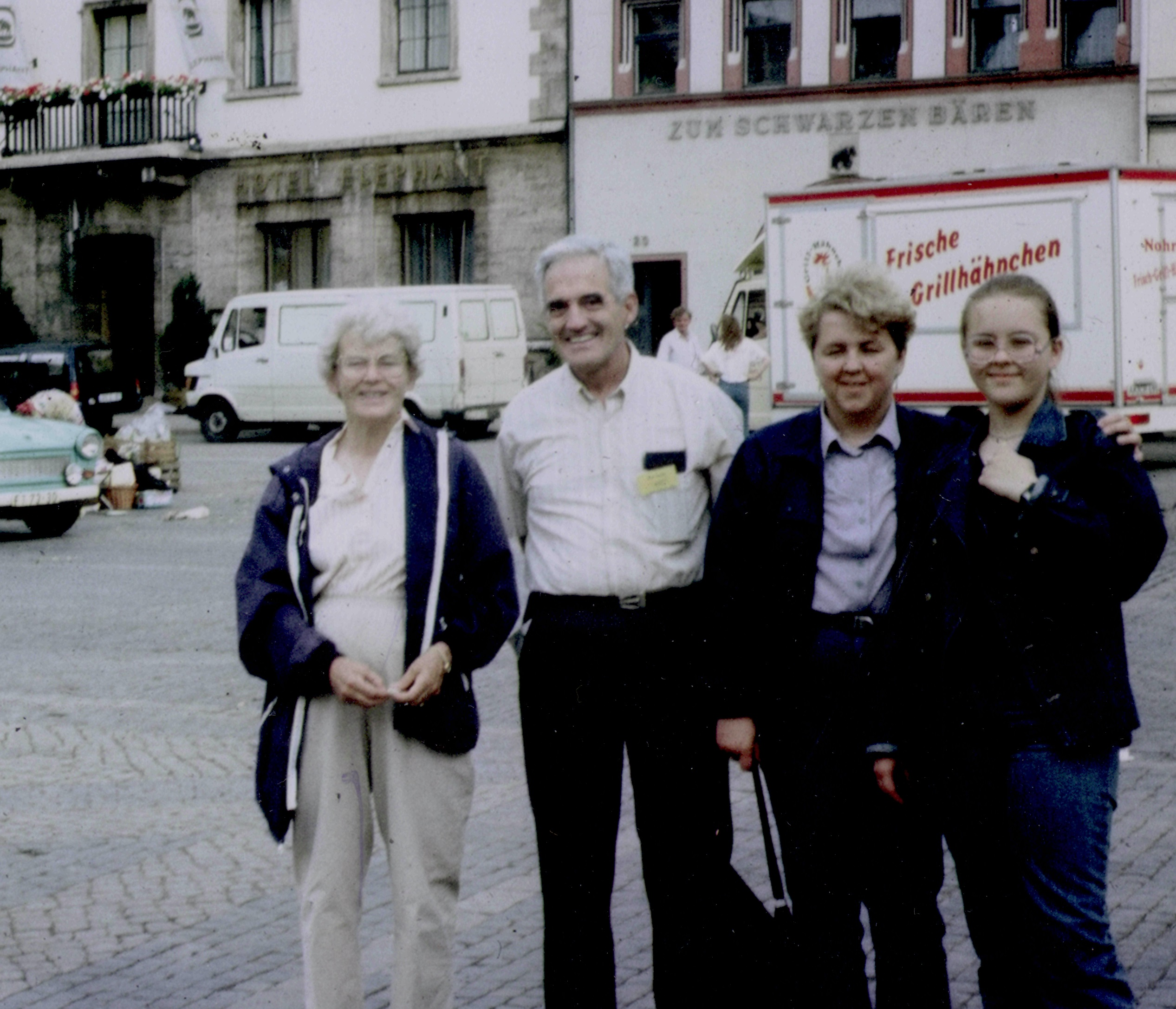
International Conference REI-91. Florence and John Davies, Inessa and Iya Tashlykova, Weimar, Germany, 1991

The second half of the 1980s was devoted to the organizational work on the acquisition, installation and launch at the Research Institute of the APP of a new ESU-2.5 produced by firm "High Voltage Engineering", summarizing the scientific results for co-authorship with F. F. Komarov and M. A. Kumakhov in monograph «Nerazrushajushhij analiz poverhnostej tverdyh tel ionnymi puchkami (Неразрушающий анализ поверхностей твердых тел ионными пучками)» (Minsk, University Press, 1987, 256 p), later translated and then published in 1990 in English by the American publishing house Gordon and Breach, entitled "Nondestructive Ion Beam Analysis of Surfaces". At the same time, a doctoral thesis was written on "Modifying and studying the structure by nuclear physical methods in crystals with different types of chemical bonds (Si, GaAs, Ni) ", defended in Kharkov State University on March 17, 1989.

=== Work at the Belarusian State Technological University ===
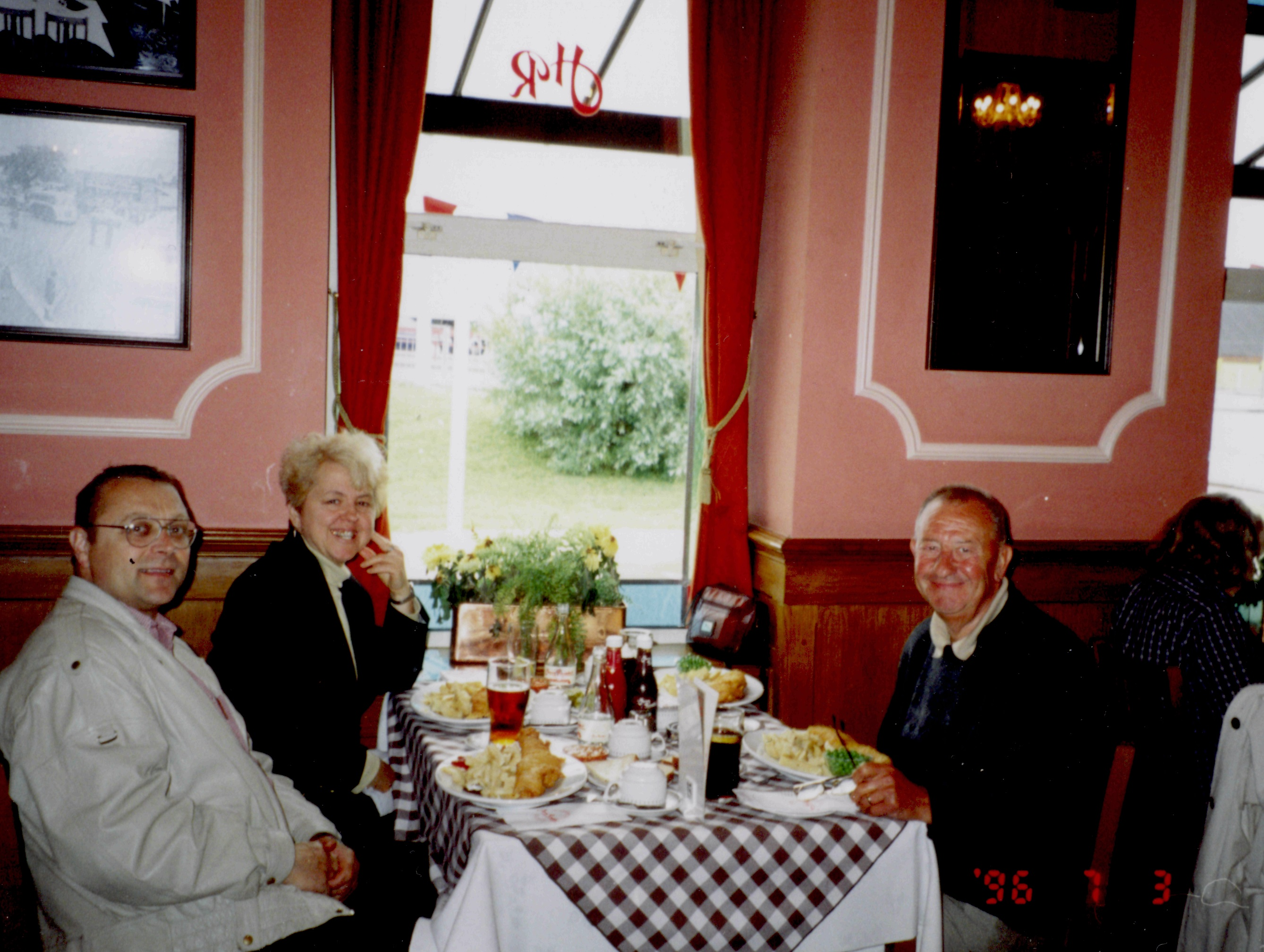
Grant of the Royal Society of Great Britain. Igor and Inessa Tashlykova, George Carter, Manchester, United Kingdom, July 1996

After starting teaching at the BSTU in August 1989, Tashlykov began researching the physical processes in the ion-assisted coating of materials and products in conditions of self-radiation. Mechanisms of damage and interpenetration of components in the area of coating / substrate phase separation induced by radiation were established and studied which were then expanded into patents. The new technology was introduced at the enterprises of the Republic of Belarus (Baranovichi Automobile Aggregate Plant, OJSC Belarusrezinotechnika, Babruysk), which resulted in creation of corrosion-resistant, inertial to the elastomer adhesion mold surface for manufacturing of rubber products. Tashlykov continued his research collaborations with scientists from Heidelberg University, the University of Jena, the University of Salford, and the Max Planck Institute for Nuclear Physics studying the modification of the surface of solids.

=== Work at Belarusian State Pedagogical University ===
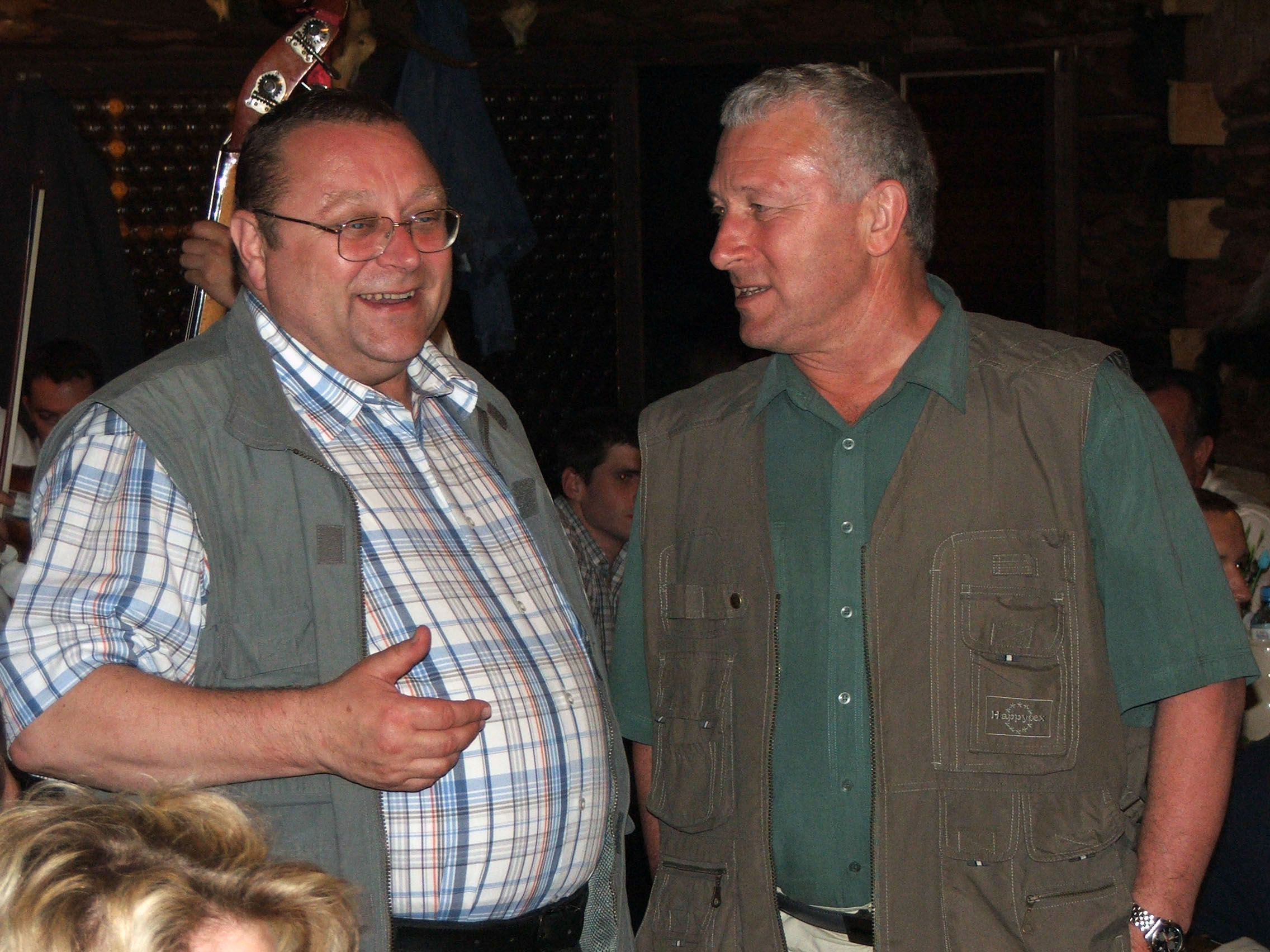
Graduates of the Physics Faculty of BSU. Igor Tashlykov and Viktor Anischik, Zakopane, Poland, 2005

Tashlykov was the Dean of the Faculty of Physics of (2003-2007), Head of the Department of General Physics (2007-2013), Professor of the Department of Physics and Methods of Teaching Physics (2013-2016) at Maxim Tank Belarusian State Pedagogical University (BPSU). After accepting the post of dean in 2003, Tashlykov worked to encourage research and teaching in the physics of functional coatings. In 2004, he started a research laboratory to study the surface of solids, equipped with an atomic force microscope, as well as a device of precise measurement of the contact angle of wetting).

In the 2000s, Tashlykov collaborated with the research group of P. V. Zhukovsky at Lublin University of Technology which led to joint research which were reported at the international conferences: "New Electrical and Electronic Technologies and their Industrial Implementations" and "Ion Implantation and other Applications of Ions and Electrons".

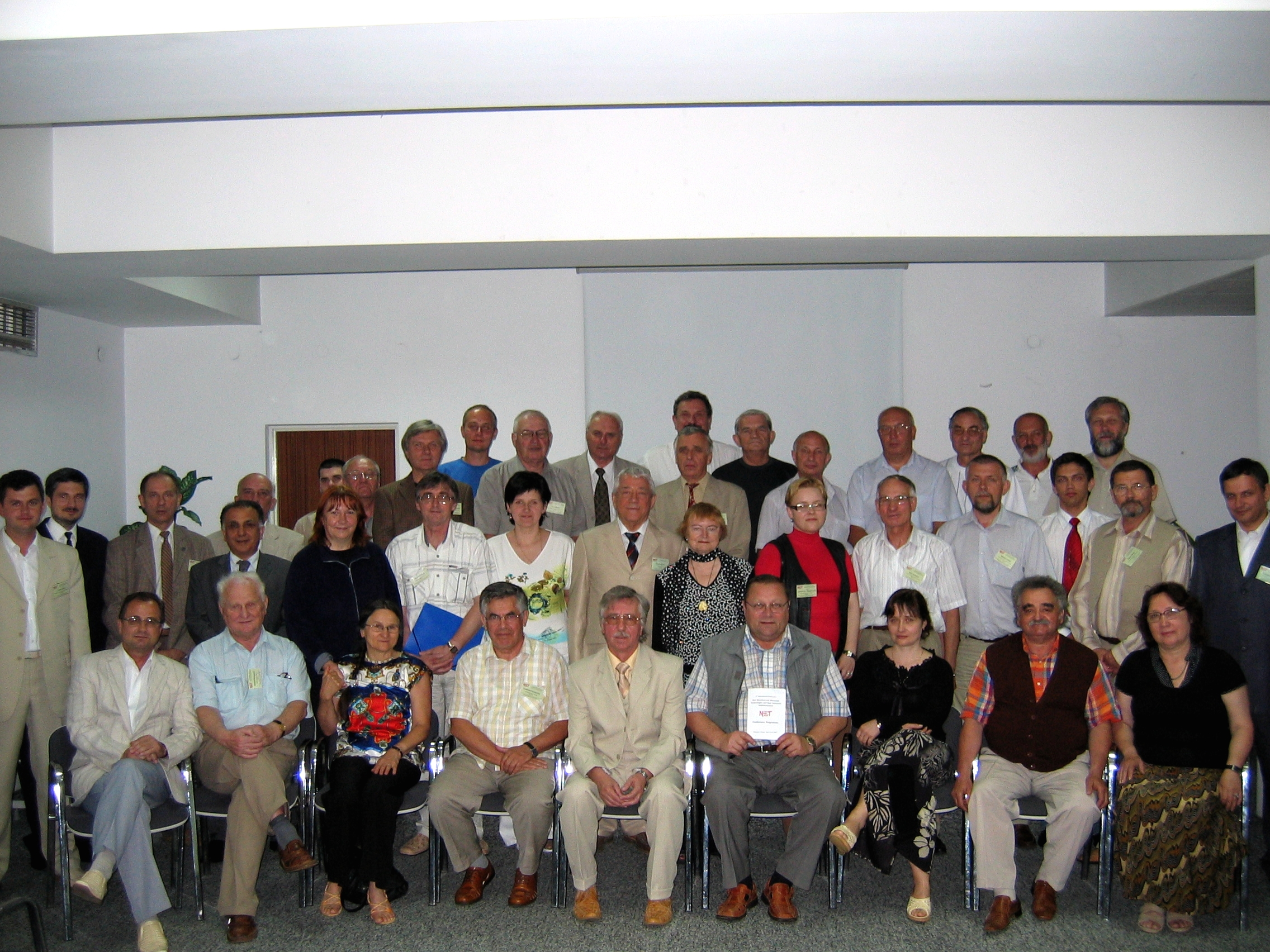
International Conference NEET, Zakopane, Poland

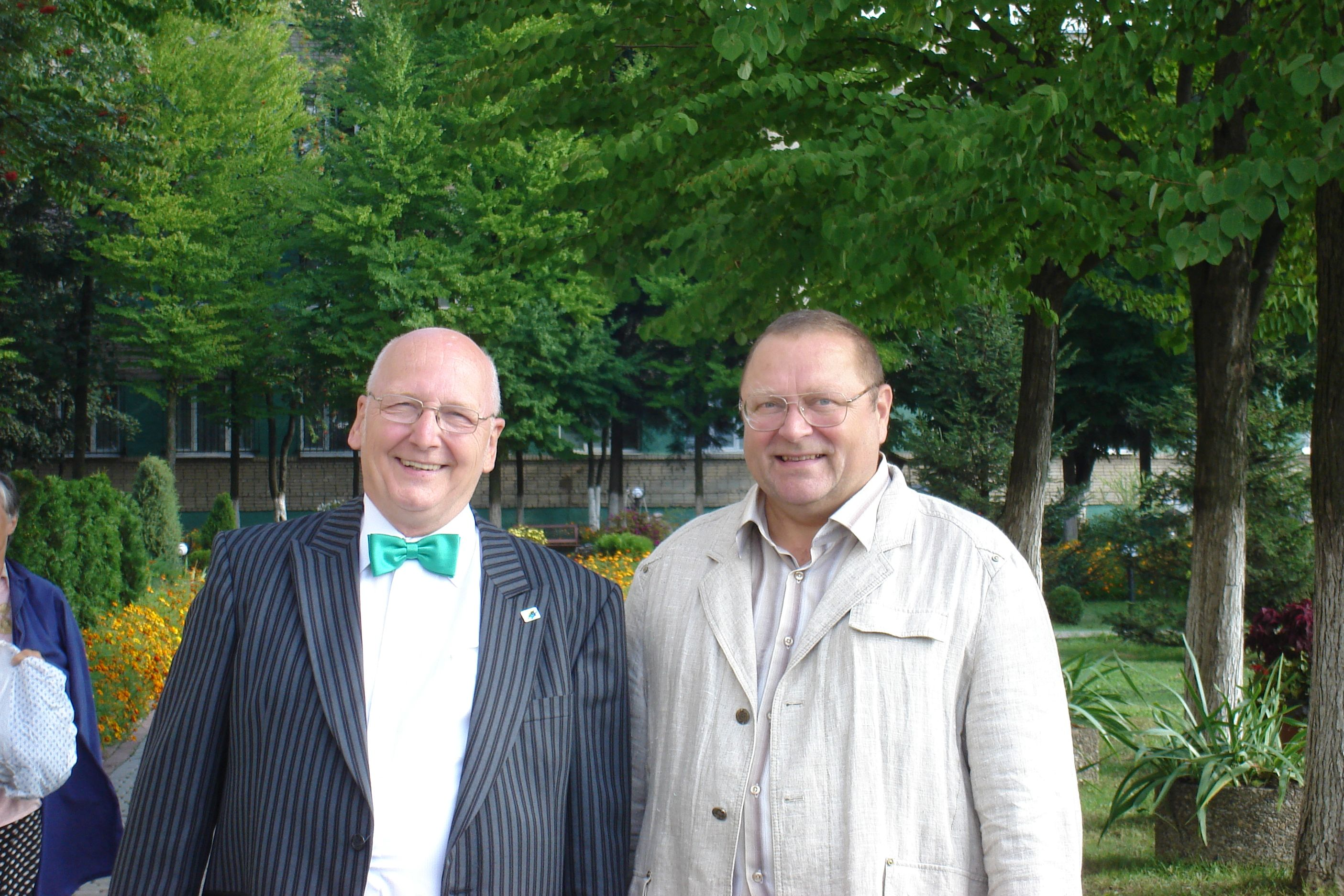
Hardwig Treff, Igor Tashlykov, Lviv, Ukraine, 2011

From 2012, Tashlykov worked on the creation of new types of cheap and environmentally friendly thin-film absorbing layers and current-carrying contacts for solar cells. In his research it was shown that application of "hot wall" technique for obtaining thin films of SnPbS system compounds with different elemental composition significantly changes the structural and the morphological characteristics of the films and improves their physical properties. In particular, a model of the surface wettability of nanosized films with distilled water has been developed which acts as an effective method for studying the characteristics of surfaces and the processes occurring on them.

== Main scientific results ==
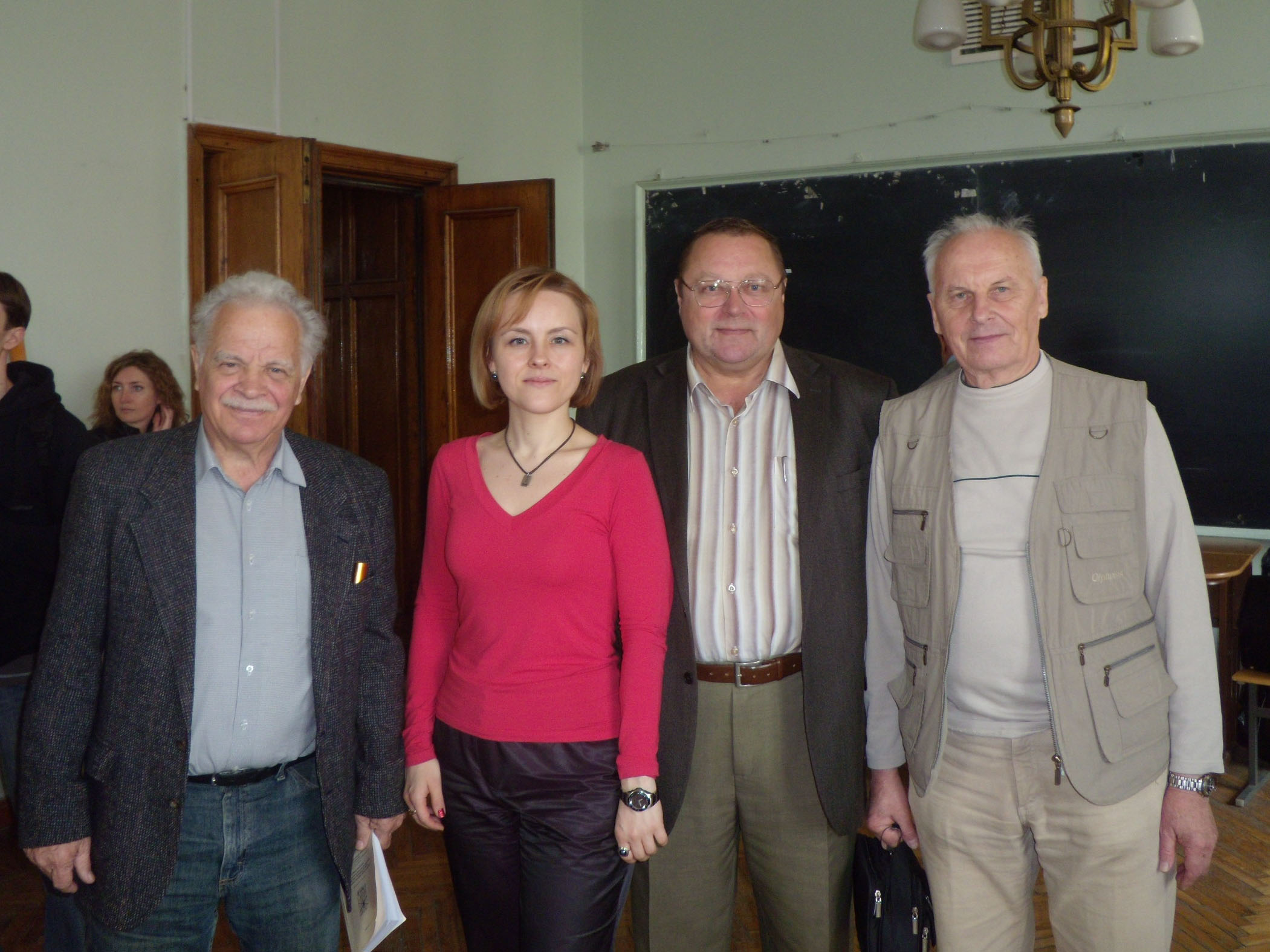
Organizing Committee of the International Tulin Conference "Physics of Interaction of Charged Particles with Crystals": Grigory Pokhil, Igor Tashlykov and Vatslav Kulikauskas, Moscow, Russia, May 2012

Tashlykov was the first Soviet scientist who used the channeling effect to study radiation defects in ion-implanted crystals. Based on the solution of the analytical equation, he developed a method for constructing profiles of radiation defects in crystals, which takes into account de-channeling of analyzing ions not only on defects, but also on thermal vibrations of atoms and their electrons.

- The fundamentals of the technology of ion-beam synthesis of layers of solid solutions based on single- and multi-component systems of materials of solid-state electronics: silicon, silicon carbide (SiC), and ternary compounds based on gallium arsenide (Al_{x}Ga_{1-x}As, GaAs_{1−x}P_{x}) have been developed.
- Mechanisms of defect formation (homogeneous, heterogeneous) and structural-phase rearrangements in semiconductor crystals during ion implantation have been established.
- The following criteria were experimentally determined: the density of the released energy in cascades of atomic collisions, the ion current density, the ion energy values, the temperature implantation and annealing modes affecting the concentration, depth distribution, type of radiation defects in the near-surface layers of ion implanted semiconductors.
- Developed regulations for ion-beam synthesis and doping of semiconductor crystals.
- The scientific and technical materials "Application of ion beams for the analysis of solids" have been developed and implemented.
- The complex of studies on ion-beam modification of electrode materials (Ni, Ti, graphite) used for the electrolysis of alkaline, acidic and other solutions was carried out. The regulations for the creation by implantation of Ag^{+} ions in Ni of catalytically active and corrosion-resistant anodes for water-alkaline electrolysis of water were developed and handed over to the Ministry of Chemical Industry and the USSR Academy of Sciences organizations.
- Fundamental results have been obtained on the mechanisms and dynamics of radiation defect formation in metal crystals during ion implantation, and a model for oxidizing the anode surface in aqueous alkaline electrolysis has been constructed.
- A theory of ion-assisted protective coatings of rubber has been developed, which takes into account the capture of auxiliary gas atoms, surface spraying, the density of ionized and deposited neutral fractions generated by the ion source.
- The "Method of deposition of coatings" has been experimentally proved and patented.
- Technological regimes for the formation of superhard nanosized films on silicon substrates for functional elements of nano- and microelectronics have been developed. The studied radiation-controlled processes of mass transfer during the deposition of thin films allow controlling adhesion at the atomic level, as well as modifying the surface properties of the absorbing layers and back contacts for solar cells.
- A vacuum method for the production of chalcogenide semiconductors Pb_{1−x}Sn_{x} (S, Te) has been developed, and regularities have been established for the variation of their electro-physical and optical properties and structural characteristics, depending on the composition and processing conditions of production, the practical applications of these materials in the field of optoelectronics as thin-film solar cells and photo converters, have been determined.

== Teaching and training ==
Tashlykov also contributed to the development and training of younger scientists. In particular:

- The monograph "Non-destructive Analysis of Solids Surfaces by Ion Beams" is used as a textbook at the BSU
- The method of resonance nuclear reactions for layer analysis of light impurities was used in a laboratory workshop on the "Backscattering method and nuclear reactions in elemental analysis of substance" for the training of students at the Kharkiv State University, Moscow State University, and Rostov State University.
- Students worked under Tashlykov at BPSU, both in research laboratories and on the Problem Council
- Tashlykov was involved with councils for the Defence of Doctoral dissertations at both BSPU and BSU.

== Awards and honors ==
In the 1980s, Tashlykov was a member of the Councils of the USSR Academy of Sciences groups on direct-action accelerators and on methods of rapid nuclear analysis. He became a member of the New York Academy of Sciences in 1994 and the Belarusian Physical Society in 1995.

- Honorable Diplomas of the Research Institute of Applied Physical Problems of BSU / Почетные грамоты НИИ прикладных физических проблем БГУ (1975, 1977, 1978, 1980, 1981, 1984, 1987).
- Honorable Diplomas of Belarusian state University / Почетные грамоты Белорусского государственного университета (1981, 1983).
- Honorable Diplomas of the Ministry of Education of the Republic of Belarus / Почетные грамоты Министерства образования Республики Беларусь (1982, 2005, 2012).
- Honorable Diplomas of the Belarusian State Pedagogical University named after M.Tank / Почетные грамоты Белорусского государственного педагогического университета им. М. Танка (2006, 2009, 2016).
- Badge of the Ministry of Education "Excellence in Education" / Знак Министерства образования «Отличник образования» (2014).
- Grant of President of the Republic of Belarus for the development of information technologies in technical creative work / Грант Президента Республики Беларусь на разработку информационных технологий в техническом творчестве (2015).
- Diploma of the State Committee on science and technology of the Republic of Belarus / Почетная грамота Государственного комитета по науке и технологиям Республики Беларусь (2016).

== Selected publications ==
- Ф.Ф.Комаров, М.А.Кумахов, И.С.Ташлыков. "Неразрушающий анализ поверхностей твердых тел ионными пучками". Мн., изд-во Университетское (1987) 256.
- F.F. Komarov, M.A. Kumakhov, I.S. Tashlykov. "Non-destructive ion beam analysis of surface". London: Gordon and Breach Science Publishers (1990) 231.
- I.S. Tashlykov. "Backscattering measurements of P+ implanted GaAs crystals". Nucl. Instrum. Methods, 170 (1980) 403-406.
- I.S. Tashlykov. "Disorder dependence of ion implanted GaAs on the type of ion". Nucl. Instrum. Methods. Phys. Res., 203 (1982) 523-526.
- G. Carter, M.J. Nobes, I.S. Tashlykov. "The influence of dose rate and analysis of procedures on measured damage in P+ ion implanted GaAs". Rad. Effects Letters, 85 (1984) 37–43.
- I.S. Tashlykov, O.A. Slesarenko. J.S. Colligon, H. Kheyrandish. "Effect of atomic mixing on the electrochemical and corrosion properties of Ni-Ti surfaces". Surfacing Journal International, 1 (1986) 106–107.
- G. Carter, J. Colligon, I.S. Tashlykov. "Evaluation of Coatings Produced by Low-Energy Ion Assisted Deposition of Co on Silicon". Material Science Forum, 248-249 (1997) 357–360.
- I.S. Tashlykov. "A model of oxide layer growth on Ag^{+} and Pt^{+} ion implanted nickel anode in aqueous alkaline solution". Thin Solid Films, 307 (1997) 106–109.
- I.S. Tashlykov, V.I. Kasperovich, M.G. Shadrukhin, A.V. Kasperovich, G.K. Wolf, W. Wesch. "Elastomer treatment by arc metal deposition assisted with self-ion irradiation". Surf. Coat. Technol., 116-119 (1999) 848–852.
- I.S.Tashlykov, O.G.Bobrovich. "Radiation damage of Si wafers modified by means of thin layer ion assisted deposition". Vacuum, 78 (2005) 337–340.
- I.S.Tashlykov, P.V.Zukowski, S.M.Baraishuk, O.M.Mikhalkovich. "Analysis of the composition of Ti-based thin films deposited on silicon by means of self-ion assisted deposition". Radiat. Eff. Defects Solids, 162 (2007) 637–641.
- I.S.Tashlykov, A.I.Turavetz, V.F.Gremenok, K.Bente, D.M.Unuchak. "Topography and water wettability of HWVD produced (Pb, Sn)S_{2} thin films for solar cells". Przeglad Elektrotechniczny, 7 (2010) 118–121.
- I.S. Tashlykov, A.I. Turavets, V.F. Gremenok, P. Żhukowski. "Elemental composition, topography and wettability of Pb_{x}Sn_{1−x}S thin films". Acta Physica Polonica A, 125 (2014) 1339–1343.
- I.Tashlykov, P. Zhukowski, O. Mikhalkovich, S. Baraishuk. "Surface properties of Me/Si structures prepared by means of self-ion assisted deposition". Acta Physica Polonica A, 125 (2014) 1306–1308.
- П.В. Коваль, А.С. Опанасюк, А.І. Туровець, І.С. Ташликов, А.Г. Понамарьов, П. Жуковскі. "Структура і елементний склад плівок Pb_{1−x}Sn_{x}S". Журнал нано- и электронной физики, Т. 7, No. 2 (2015) 02013-1-02013-7.
