= Stanislav Galaktionov =

Soviet and American biologist

- Photo of Stanislav Galaktionov
- Born: Stanislav Gennadyevich Galaktionov; March 7, 1937; Smolensk, Soviet Union
- Died: April 8, 2011 (aged 74); Mobile, Alabama, United States
- Education: Belarusian Forestry Institute
- Known for: Work in the field of molecular modelling
- Scientific career
- Fields: Molecular biology
- Workplaces: Institute of Experimental Botany; Institute of Heat and Mass Transfer; All-Union Research Institute for Genetics and Selection of Industrial Microorganisms; Latvian Institute of Organic Synthesis; Washington University in St. Louis
- Doctoral advisor: Mikhail N. Goncharik; Teodor L. Perelman

Stanislav Gennadyevich Galaktionov (Станисла́в Генна́дьевич Галактио́нов; 7 March 1937 – 8 April 2011) was a Soviet and American biologist. Born into a family of engineers, he pursued a scientific career in the Soviet Union before emigrating to the United States in 1991. He died in 2011.

Galaktionov graduated from the Belarusian Forestry Institute and worked at the Institute of Biology of the Belarusian Academy of Sciences. He held research posts in Minsk (at the Institute of Heat and Mass Transfer and the All-Union Research Institute for Genetics and Selection of Industrial Microorganisms), in Riga (at the Latvian Institute of Organic Synthesis), and in St. Louis (at Washington University).

He was among the early researchers in molecular modelling, specializing in peptides and proteins with applications in medicinal chemistry and drug design. He developed computational approaches for analyzing conformations, structure–activity relationships, and receptor interactions of biologically active peptides and proteins, and worked on the design of peptide drugs with enhanced stability and efficacy. By 1988, Galaktionov had published over 100 scientific works and several popular science books, some of which remained in use in university curricula in Russia, Belarus and Ukraine through at least 2016.

Galaktionov’s work was noted as enhancing the prestige of the Belarusian Institute of Experimental Botany. He was recognized by Soviet, Belarusian and American scientists for his research on peptide structure and protein fold prediction and important contributions to molecular modelling. His work was later praised by Western colleagues such as Harold Scheraga and Garland R. Marshall. Galaktionov was known for his support of the research work of his colleagues.

== Biography ==
Stanislav Galaktionov was born on 7 March 1937 in Smolensk, Soviet Union. His parents worked at the Smolensk Machine-Building Plant, where his mother later became chief engineer. After the death of his father in 1951, the family moved to Minsk, where his mother became chief engineer at the Udarnik Plant.

He graduated from the Belarusian Forestry Institute, held research posts in Minsk and Riga, and defended his Candidate (1963) and Doctor of Biological Sciences (1973) dissertations. In 1991, he emigrated to the United States, and was granted American citizenship in 1996.

In July 2001, Galaktionov suffered a severe traumatic brain injury, which ended his scientific career. In 2002, he moved to Mobile, Alabama, where his daughter lived with her family. He died on 8 April 2011 following complications after heart surgery and was buried at the Mobile Botanical Gardens.

== Career ==
After graduating, Galaktionov took a position as a senior laboratory assistant at the Institute of Biology of the Belarusian Academy of Sciences.

In January 1960, Galaktionov was admitted to the postgraduate program at the Institute of Experimental Botany. In 1963, at the age of 27, he defended his Candidate of Biological Sciences dissertation on the effect of chloride ions in potash fertilizers on potato yields. At the same time, he attended an extensive series of courses at the Faculty of Physics of Belarusian State University, adding to his general biological erudition a perspective on biological processes from the standpoint of physics, as well as knowledge of mathematical methods.

In 1967, he joined the Institute of Heat and Mass Transfer of the Belarusian Academy of Sciences, working under Teodor L. Perelman. His research group focused on conformational analysis of peptides. In 1973, he defended his doctoral dissertation titled "Investigation of the Spatial Molecular Structure of Proteins and Peptides".

In 1977, Galaktionov and his team moved to the Latvian Institute of Organic Synthesis of the Academy of Sciences of the Latvian SSR, where he continued research on biologically active peptides. After returning to Minsk, he headed a laboratory at the All-Union Research Institute for Genetics and Selection of Industrial Microorganisms, shifting focus to larger protein structures.

In 1991, he emigrated to the United States, joining the Center for Molecular Design at Washington University in St. Louis on the recommendation of Gregory V. Nikiforovich. He worked there for ten years under Garland R. Marshall.

== Scientific work ==
In the late 1960s, after joining the Institute of Heat and Mass Transfer of the Belarusian Academy of Sciences, Galaktionov developed a mathematical algorithm for calculating the coordinates of any atom in a molecular chain based on the coordinates of preceding atoms. This innovation significantly reduced computation time and opened the prospect of predicting the three-dimensional structures of proteins. Recognizing this as a central challenge in molecular biology, Galaktionov formed a team of physicists and mathematicians, which soon produced calculations of amino acid structures and, by the mid-1970s, achieved a world first — a detailed computational model of the nine-amino-acid peptide bradykinin. The results were later confirmed experimentally and helped establish the understanding that linear peptides can spontaneously fold into structures resembling cyclic forms.

Galaktionov's research focused on the molecular modelling of peptides and proteins, with applications in medicinal chemistry and drug design. He contributed to the development of computational approaches for studying peptide and protein conformations, their structure–activity relationships, and receptor interactions, including pioneering Soviet studies on the molecular mechanics of biologically active peptides and the conformational analysis of peptide hormones. His work also addressed the synthesis–structure–activity relationships of peptide and protein analogs, including modifications aimed at increasing their stability and activity, and the design of peptide drugs with improved pharmacological properties.

At the same time, Galaktionov continued his research on the effects of ions on plants (the subject of his first dissertation), but now at a new — cellular — level. Together with Vladimir Yurin, also a graduate of the Forestry Institute, he developed a theory describing the passive transport of ions through plant cell membranes. Galaktionov pursued this work independently, without involving members of his "conformational" group, and co-authored two scientific monographs and three popular science books on the subject.

Galaktionov developed a novel ab initio protein fold prediction method using contact-matrix constraints to exclude overly compact or extended folds, enabling efficient exploration of plausible structures for further modeling and refinement.

He was the author of over 100 scientific works and several popular science books. Galaktionov trained a number of students who went on to become Doctors and Candidates of Science, and founded a scientific school that continued its work around the world. His works were used in the curricula of higher education institutions in Russia, Belarus and Ukraine through at least 2016.

== Scholarly reception ==
In Belarus, even as a candidate of sciences, Galaktionov's opinion was valued by leading Moscow professors. His research was highly regarded by leading Soviet scientists, including Academician Yuri Ovchinnikov, Professors Oleg Ptitsyn and Alexander Kitaigorodsky.

Professor Gregory Nikiforovich described Galaktionov as one of the pioneers of molecular modelling and praised his research on the passive transport of ions through plant cell membranes as successful.

Recognizing the prospects of biophysics, as Professor Valery Veresov observed, Galaktionov initiated the creation of a corresponding scientific school in Belarus, which operated for many years at the world level and contributed to the development of related scientific fields.

Professor Vladimir Yurin wrote that, in collective monographs, Galaktionov played a decisive role in interpreting the presented results. According to Yurin, in the 1970s Galaktionov was ahead of contemporary molecular biology in more than one area of research. Yurin also notes Galaktionov's skill in popularizing scientific ideas and explaining them to non-specialists.

According to Academician of the National Academy of Sciences of Belarus Professor Viktor Parfenov, Galaktionov was among the researchers who enhanced the scientific prestige and recognition of the Belarusian Institute of Experimental Botany.

Professor Harold Scheraga of Cornell University praised Galaktionov's studies on the structure of linear peptides, expressing regret that he could not become acquainted with them earlier because of the Iron Curtain.

Professor Garland R. Marshall highlighted Galaktionov as one of his long-term collaborators whose work had a significant impact on his scientific career. Other scholars — including Tseitin, Veresov, Nikiforovich, and Yurin — acknowledged Galaktionov’s decisive role in their scientific careers and his support for their research.

Professor Engels Doroshevich noted the large number of students who studied microbiology under Galaktionov and his talent as a lecturer.

== Views and habits ==
Colleagues described Galaktionov as a meticulous and disciplined scientist, attentive to experimental detail and cautious in drawing conclusions. He was known for a principled approach to publications, preferring to release only thoroughly verified results. According to contemporaries, his commitment to methodological rigor and accuracy was a defining feature of his research style.

Galaktionov was skeptical about the Soviet system; he expressed his views in private conversations and, when possible, in professional settings. He was also noted for supporting and protecting Jewish colleagues from workplace discrimination during the Soviet period.

== Bibliography ==
=== Scientific monographs ===
- Galaktionov, S. G.; Nikiforovich, G. V.; Perelman, T. L. Diffusion in Complex Molecular Structures. Moscow: Nauka i tekhnika, 1974 (in Russian).
- Yurin, V. M.; Goncharik, M. N.; Galaktionov, S. G. Ion Transport Across Plant Cell Membranes. Moscow: Nauka i tekhnika, 1977 (in Russian).
- Galaktionov, S. G. Asymmetry of Biological Molecules. Minsk: Vysshaya shkola, 1978, ISBN 5-1332746-А. (in Russian).
- Galaktionov, S. G.; Nikiforovich, G. V.; Chipens, G. I.; Shenderovich, M. D. Angiotensin: Molecular Mechanisms of Action. Riga: Zinatne, 1979 (in Russian).
- Yurin, V. M.; Ivanchenko, V. M.; Galaktionov, S. G. Regulation of Functions of Plant Cell Membranes. Minsk: Nauka i tekhnika, 1979, ISBN 5-1362341-А. (in Russian).
- Nikiforovich, G. V.; Galaktionov, S. G.; Chipens, G. I. Conformations of Peptide Bioregulators. Moscow: Meditsina, 1983 (in Russian).
- Galaktionov, S. G.; Golubovich, V. P.; Shenderovich, M. D.; Akhrem, A. A. Introduction to the Theory of Receptors. Minsk: Nauka i tekhnika, 1986 (in Russian).

=== Popular science books ===
- Galaktionov, S. G.; Yurin, V. M. Physics of Biological Membranes. Minsk: Znanie, 1976 (in Russian).
- Galaktionov, S. G.; Nikiforovich, G. V. Conversations About Life. Moscow: Molodaya gvardiya, 1977 (in Russian).
- Galaktionov, S. G.; Yurin, V. M. Botanists with a Galvanometer. Moscow: Znanie, 1979 (in Russian).
- Galaktionov, S. G.; Yurin, V. M. The Alga Signals Danger. Moscow: Vysshaya shkola, 1980 (in Russian).
- Galaktionov, S. G. Biologically Active. Moscow: Molodaya gvardiya, 1988, ISBN 978-5-235-00707-9. online (in Russian).
- Galaktsyonaŭ, S. G.; Yatskevich, G. M. The Knight of Science from Nyankava. Minsk: Navuka i tekhnika, 1989 ISBN 978-5-343-00392-5 (in Belarusian).

The book "Conversations About Life" was also published in Bulgarian, Japanese, and Latvian.

=== Selected scientific articles ===
- Galaktionov S. G., Nikolaichik V. V., Tseitin V. M., Mikhneva L. M. “Middle molecules” — Endotoxins of peptide nature (англ.) // Pharmaceutical Chemistry Journal. — 1983. — November (vol. 17, no. 11). — P. 759–765. — ISSN 0091-150X. — doi:10.1007/BF00765126.
- Rodionov M.A., Galaktionov S.G., Akhrem A.A. Prediction of exposure degree diagram and sites of limited proteolysis in globular proteins as an approach to computer-aided design of protein bioregulators with prolonged action (англ.) // FEBS Letters. — 1987. — 2 November (vol. 223, no. 2). — P. 402–404. — ISSN 0014-5793. — doi:10.1016/0014-5793(87)80327-7.
- Galaktionov S. G., Nikolaichik V. V., Yurin V. M., Birger P. S., Kozlovskaya E. V., Mikhneva L. M., Mazur L. I., Tseitin V. M. Investigation of protectors that modify the damaging action of peptides of the group of “medium-sized molecules” on blood cells (англ.) // Pharmaceutical Chemistry Journal. — 1991. — November (vol. 25, no. 11). — P. 756–760. — ISSN 0091-150X. — doi:10.1007/BF00767250.
