= Aldridge Botanical Gardens =

Garden in Alabama, USA

Coordinates: 33.386670°N 86.792067°W

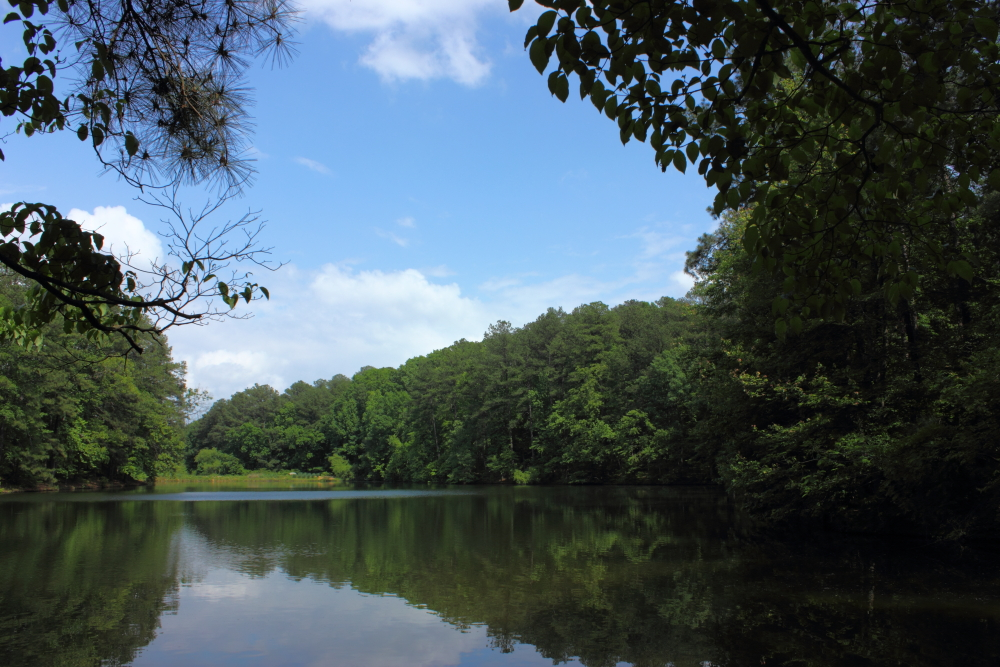
Lake in Aldridge Botanical Gardens

Aldridge Gardens is a 30-acre (121,000 m^{2}) botanical garden, prominently featuring hydrangeas, located on the former Aldridge Estate in Hoover, Alabama, United States.

Local nurseryman Eddie Aldridge purchased the property from the Coxe family in 1977 as a residence. Aldridge, who along with his father, Loren L. Aldridge, found and patented Hydrangea quercifolia 'Snowflake', a double-flowering form of Oakleaf Hydrangea. In 1997 the gardens were conveyed to the City of Hoover and formally dedicated to the public. The site is now managed by a non-profit organization. A new master plan was approved in 1997 to guide the future development of the gardens.

The gardens contain extensive hydrangea plantings, as well as a five acre (20,234 m^{2}) lake with walking trails. Public lectures and educational activities are scheduled throughout the year.

== See also ==
- List of botanical gardens and arboretums in Alabama
