= List of botanical gardens and arboretums in Alabama =

This list of botanical gardens and arboretums in Alabama is intended to include all significant botanical gardens and arboretums in the U.S. state of Alabama.

Name	Founded	Image	Size	Admission	Affiliation	City	Coordinates
Aldridge Botanical Gardens	2002		30 acres (12 ha)	Free	City of Hoover	Hoover	33°23′12.01″N 86°47′31.44″W
William Bartram Arboretum	1984		30 acres (12 ha)	Free	Alabama; Historical; Commission	Wetumpka	32°51′00″N 86°25′00″W
Bellingrath Gardens and Home	1932		65 acres (26 ha)	Fee charged	Bellingrath- Morse; Foundation	Theodore	30°25′49″N 88°8′26″W
Birmingham Botanical Gardens	1963		67.5 acres (27.3 ha)	Free	City of Birmingham/ Friends of Birmingham; Botanical Gardens	Birmingham	33°29′30″N 86°46′28″W
Donald E. Davis Arboretum	1977		14 acres (5.7 ha)	Free	Auburn; University	Auburn	32°35′44″N 85°28′58″W
Dothan Area Botanical Gardens	1990		50 acres (20 ha)	Free	Dothan Area Botanical Gardens, Inc.	Dothan	31°17′45.95″N 85°22′15.61″W
Huntsville Botanical Garden	1988		112 acres (45 ha)	Fee charged	Huntsville; Botanical; Garden; Foundation	Huntsville	34°42′25.2″N 86°37′58.8″W
Jasmine Hill Gardens	1928		20 acres (8.1 ha)	Fee charged	Jasmine; Hill; Foundation	Montgomery	32°29′45.6″N 86°11′9.6″W
Mobile Botanical Gardens	1974		100 acres (40 ha)	Fee charged	City of Mobile	Mobile	30°41′58.52″N 88°9′41.26″W
Noccalula Falls Botanical Gardens			65 acres (26 ha)	Free	City of Gadsden	Gadsden	34°2′29.36″N 86°1′16.61″W
Troy University Arboretum	1988		75 acres (30 ha)	Free	Troy; University	Troy	31°47′38.4″N 85°57′28.8″W
University of Alabama Arboretum	1958		60 acres (24 ha)	Free	University of Alabama	Tuscaloosa	33°11′36.56″N 87°28′50.2″W

== See also ==
- Alabama Champion Tree Program
- List of botanical gardens and arboretums in the United States
