= Troy University Arboretum =

Botanical garden in Troy, Alabama

Coordinates: 31.794°N 85.958°W

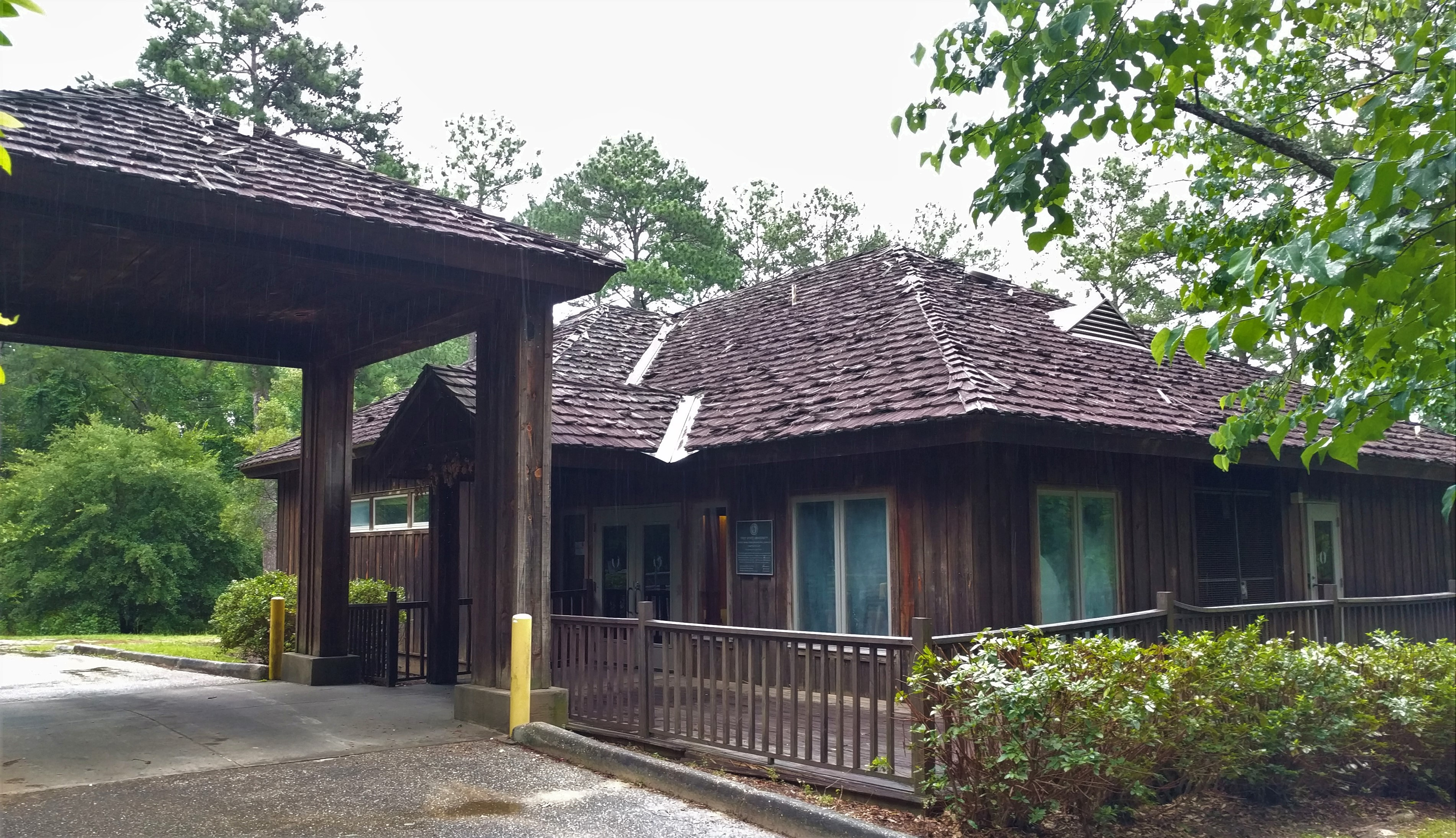
- Interactive map of Troy University Arboretum
- Type: Arboretum; nature preserve
- Location: Troy, Alabama, United States
- Website: Troy University Arboretum

The Troy University Arboretum is an arboretum and nature preserve, located next to the Troy University campus in Troy, Alabama. The Arboretum includes 75 acres (30 hectares), and over 300 different species of trees, as well as a 2.5 miles (4.0 km) nature trail with a swamp, stream, and the 4 acres (1.6 hectares) Mullis Pond. It is open to the public.

== See also ==
- List of botanical gardens and arboretums in Alabama
