= Jasmine Hill Gardens =

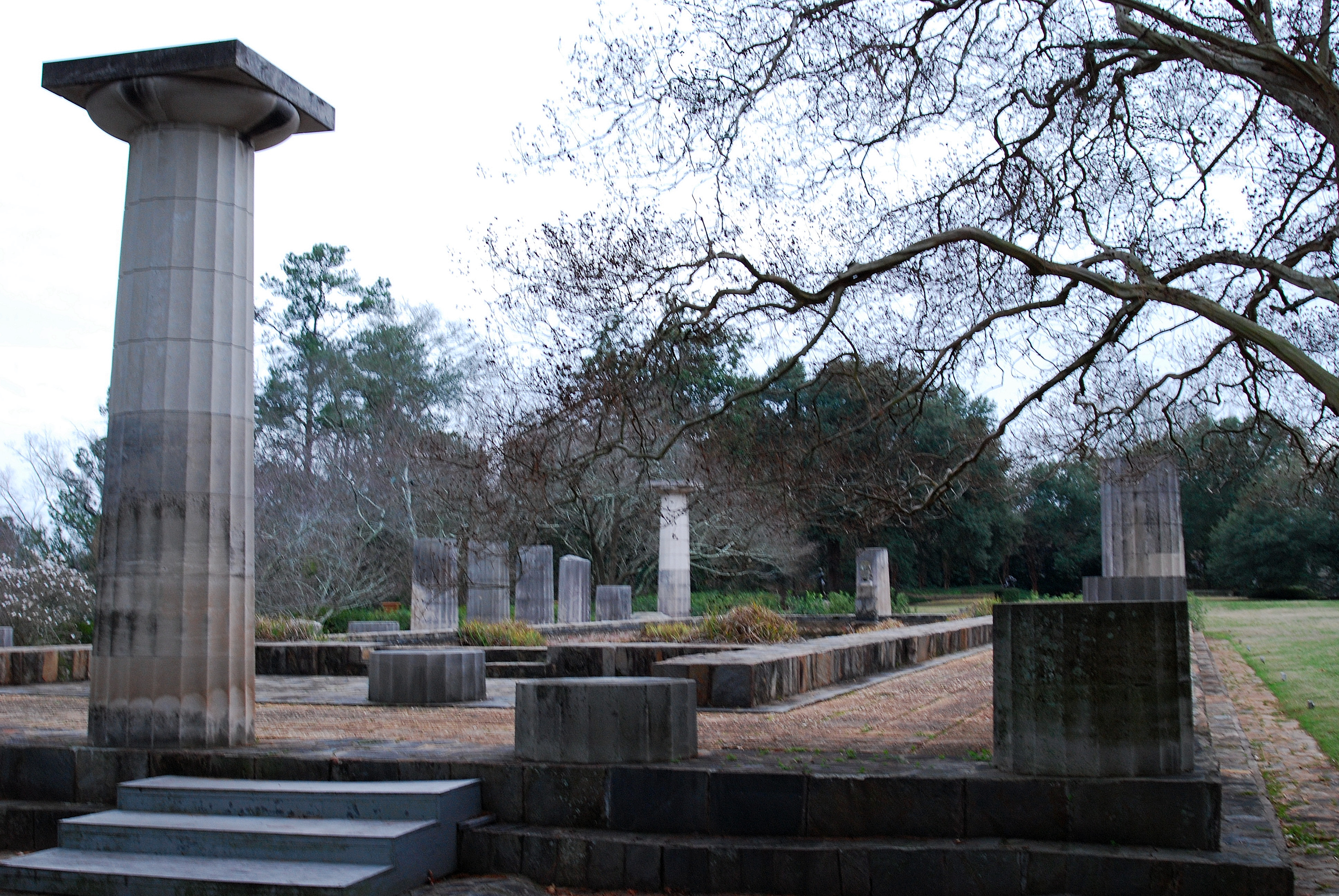
- Replica of the Temple of Hera ruins at the Jasmine Hill Gardens.

- Location within Alabama
- 32.496°N 86.186°W
- Location: Wetumpka, Alabama

Alabama Register of Landmarks and Heritage
- Official name: Jasmine Hill Gardens
- Designated: July 21, 1977

Jasmine Hill Gardens (20 acres) is a botanical garden located on U. S. Route 231 near Wetumpka, Alabama, north of Montgomery. As of May 23, 2020, the garden is permanently closed to the public. Jasmine Hill was added to the Alabama Register of Landmarks and Heritage on July 21, 1977.

The gardens were established in the early 1930s by Benjamin and Mary Fitzpatrick. In 1971, Jim and Elmore Inscoe became the primary conservators. In 1996, the Olympic Torch, which originated in the Temple of Hera ruins, toured through Jasmine Hill Gardens on its way to the 1996 Summer Olympics in Atlanta. Today, they feature a collection of nearly 40 pieces of Greek statuary, both original and copies. The site includes a reproduction of the ruins of the Temple of Hera at Olympia, Greece, and a separate restored temple façade at the museum entrance, as it would have appeared in ancient times. Other attractions include fountains, stairways, and hedges.

== See also ==
- List of botanical gardens and arboretums in Alabama
- Wetumpka crater
