= Temple of Hera, Olympia =

Temple in Greece

Coordinates: 37°38′20″N 21°37′47″E

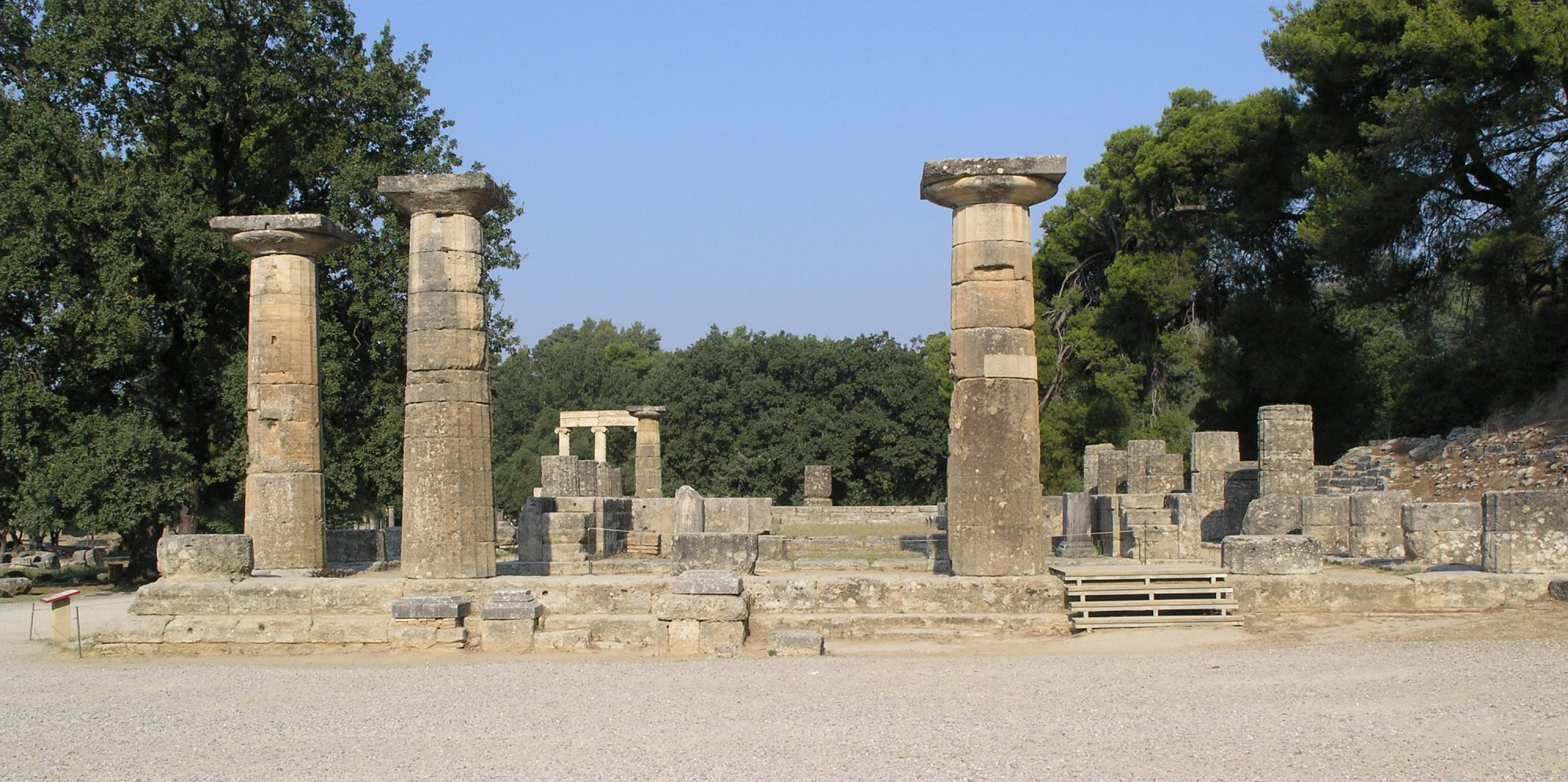
Restored ruins of the temple

Olympia site map: #4 Temple of Hera is in dark purple (top center). The long ancient Olympic stadium is at far right.

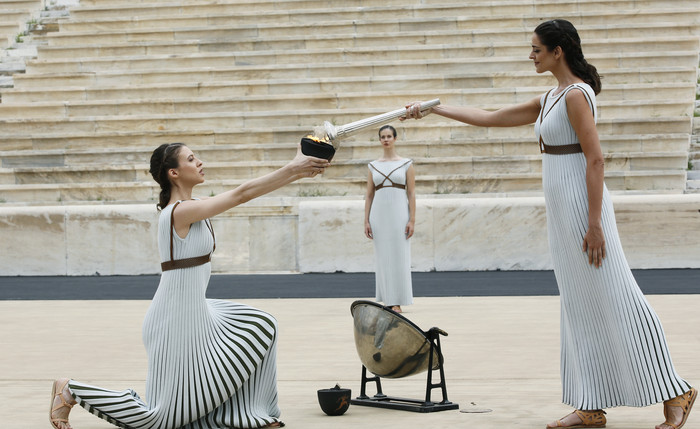
Olympic flame

The Temple of Hera, or Heraion, is an ancient Archaic Greek temple at Olympia, Greece, that was dedicated to Hera, queen of the Greek gods. It is the oldest temple at Olympia and one of the most venerable in all of Greece. It was originally a joint temple of Hera and Zeus, chief of the gods, until a separate temple was built for him. It is at the altar of this temple, which is oriented east-west, that the Olympic flame is lit and carried to all parts of the world. The torch of the Olympic flame is lit in its ruins to this day. The temple was built in ca. 580 BC, but was destroyed by an earthquake in the early 4th century AD.

== History ==
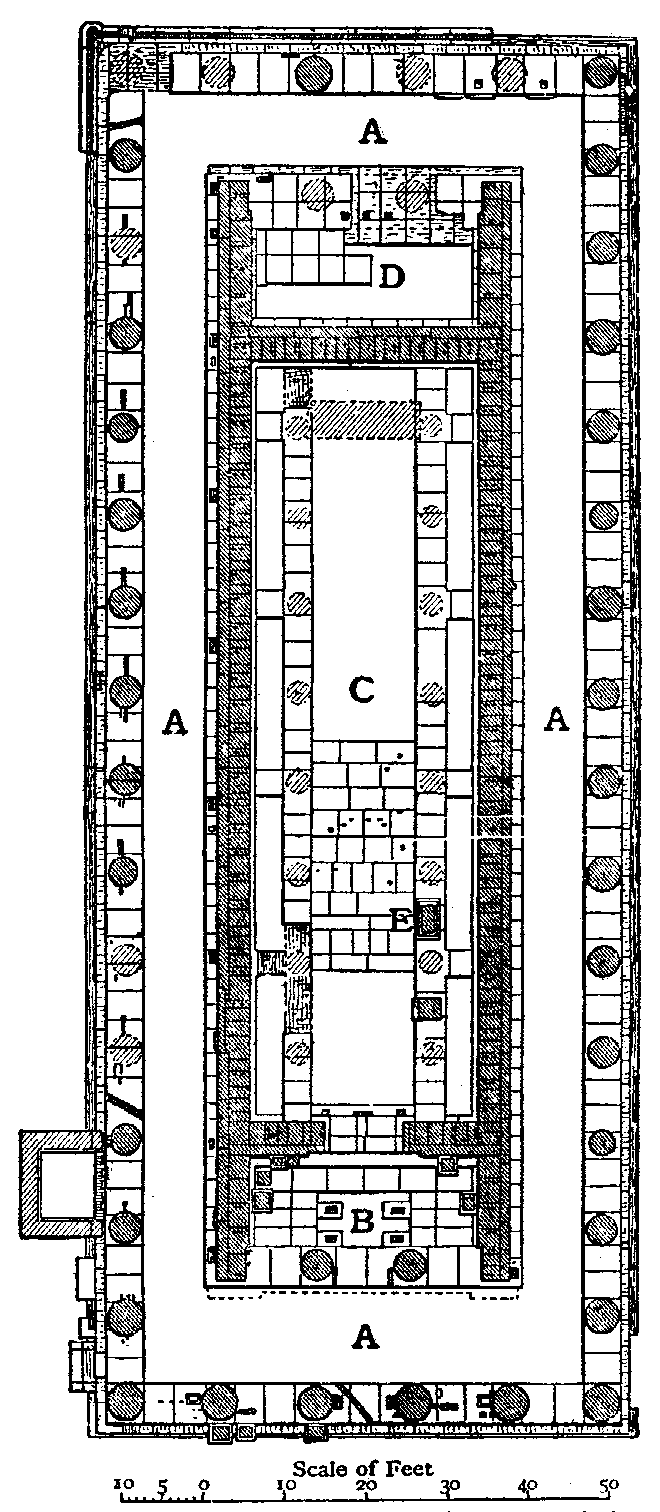
Plan of the Temple of Hera. (A: Peristyle; B: Pronaos; C: Naos; D: Opisthodomos; E: Base of Statue of Hermes).

The Heraion at Olympia, located in the north of the sacred precinct, the Altis, is one of the earliest Doric temples in Greece, and the oldest peripteral temple at that site, having a single row of columns on all sides. The location may have previously been the place of worship of an older cult.

The temple was erected in ca. 600-580 BC, most likely as a dedication by the Triphylian polis of Skillous. It is suggested that this dedication by a nearby city would originally have been in honour of the main patron deity at Olympia, Hera, and rededicated to include Zeus, her husband and brother, at a later point—perhaps after 580 BC when control of Olympia had passed from Triphylia to Elis, or in the 5th century BC when the famous Temple of Zeus was built. The temple was closed during the persecution of pagans in the late Roman Empire.

In the Archaic Greek period, the temple stored items important to Greek culture, and other offerings of the people.

== Description ==
=== Layout ===
The temple measures 61 by 164 ft (19 by 50 m) at the level of the temple platform, the stylobate. It was longer and narrower than the common architecture of the previous era, though the elongated proportions are a common feature of early Doric architecture. It has a peripteros — a colonnaded perimeter — of 6 by 16 columns which were originally wooden, but site archaeology does not support this theory

The travel writer Pausanias described it in his Description of Greece:

It remains after this for me to describe the temple of Hera [at Olympia] and the noteworthy objects contained in it. The Elean account says that it was the people of Skillos, one of the cities in Triphylia, who built the temple about eight years after Oxylos came to the throne of Elis. The style of the temple is Doric, and pillars stand all round it. In the rear chamber one of the two pillars is of oak. The length of the temple is one hundred and sixty-nine feet, the breadth sixty-three feet, the height not short of fifty feet. Who the architect was they do not relate.

=== Columns ===
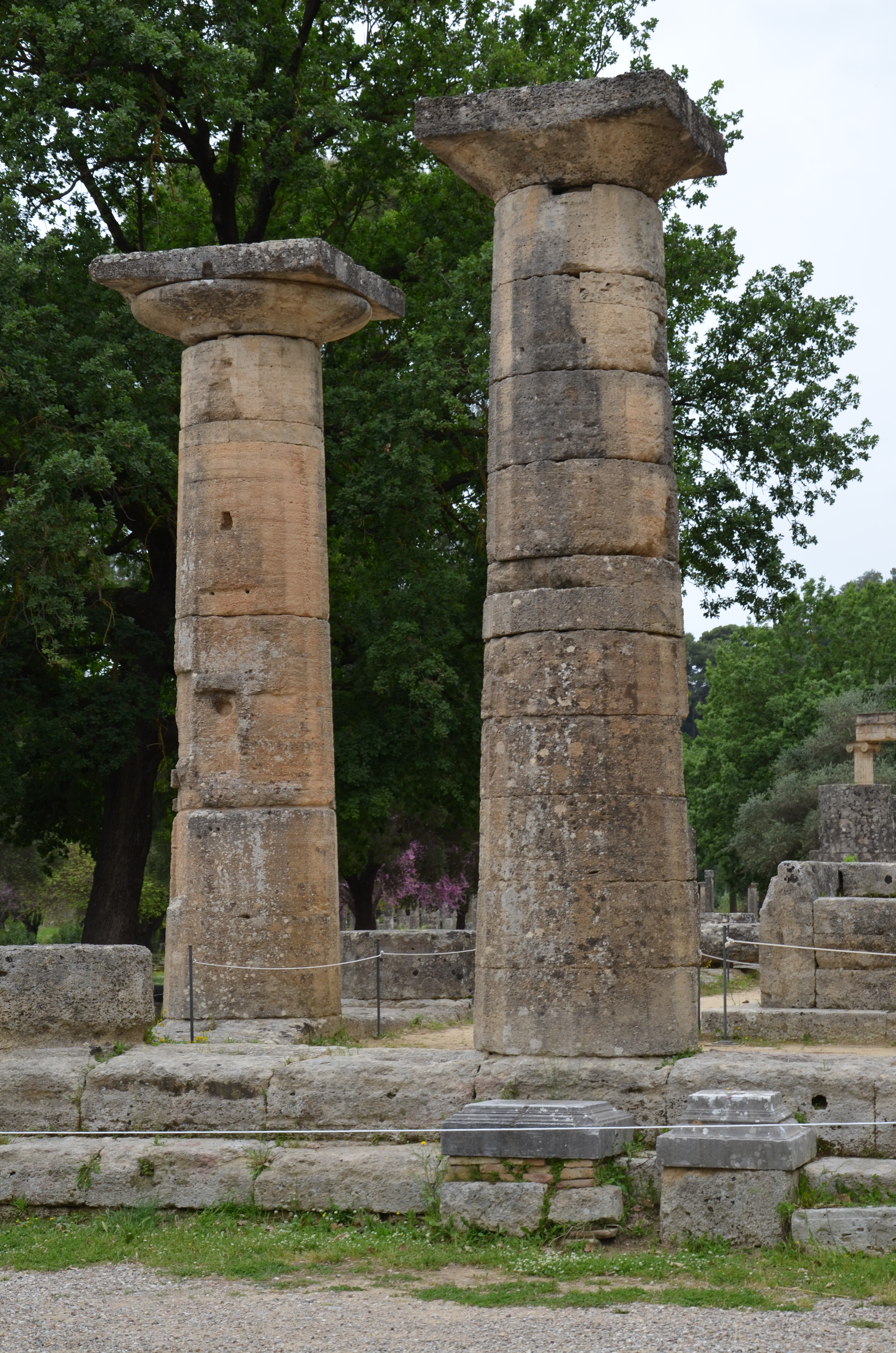
Doric columns of the Temple of Hera

The original wooden columns of the temple were gradually replaced with ones made of stone gradually between the mid 6th century BC and the Christian era. In 173 AD, one of the two columns in the opisthodomos was still oak. As the replacements took place at widely differing periods between the Archaic and Roman periods, and were carved under the influence of their respective contemporary styles, they differ considerably in proportions and detail. This becomes apparent in the columns' capitals, as each one is slightly different from the next. Additionally, column shafts differ by nearly 1 ft (0.30 m) in diameter, and one even has a different number of flutes than the rest. Another theory holds that the columns are so different, not because wooden columns were being replaced, but because various workshops erected different stone columns at the same time. Perhaps each style represented the major city-states or private donors for whom these builders were working, as Olympia was a pan-Doric sanctuary. No remains of the entablature above the columns were found, but are believed to have been wooden.

=== Walls and roof ===
The walls had a bottom course of stone with a mudbrick superstructure, another feature typical of early Greek architecture. Other parts of the temple were made from limestone, unbaked bricks, and terracotta tiles. Holes in the protrusions at the ends of the walls—antae—indicate that a wooden cladding protected them from the elements. The temple had a Laconian-style roof; its pediments were decorated with disk acroteria of 2.5 m (8.2 ft) diameter, each made in one single piece (one is on display at the Archaeological Museum of Olympia).

=== Contents ===
The opisthodomos was also used to store numerous other objects, including many further statues of deities and votive offerings of Zeus and Hera. Among the few of these objects to survive was a statue of Hermes holding baby Dionysos, which is generally identified as the Hermes of Praxiteles, one of the most important preserved examples of Greek sculpture.

Pausanias also witnessed a small ivory-clad couch (purportedly once belonging to Hippodameia), the bronze disc of Iphitus of Elis (commemorating the truce that according to legend founded the Olympic games), and the table on which the olive wreaths for the victors were displayed during the Olympic Games.

Pausanias recounts a number of objects beside the cult statues:

In the temple of Hera [at Olympia] is an image of Zeus, and the image of Hera is sitting on a throne with Zeus standing by her, bearded and with a helmet on his head. They are crude works of art. The figures of Horai (Seasons) next to them, seated upon thrones, were made by the Aeginetan Smilis. Beside them stands an image of Themis, as being mother of the Horai. It is the work of Dorykleidas [...] The Hesperides, five in number, were made by Theokles [...] The Athena wearing a helmet and carrying a spear and shield is, it is said, a work of Medon [...] Then Kore (the Maid) and Demeter sit opposite each other, while Apollon and Artemis stand opposite each other. Here too have been dedicated Leto, Tykhe (Fortune), Dionysos and a winged Nike (Victory). I cannot say who the artists were, but these figures too are in my opinion very ancient. The figures I have enumerated are of ivory and gold, but at a later date other images were dedicated in the Heraion, including a marble Hermes carrying the baby Dionysos, a work of Praxiteles, and a bronze Aphrodite made by Kleon of Sikyon [...] A nude gilded child is seated before Aphrodite, a work fashioned by Boithos of Kalkhedon. There were also brought hither from what is called the Philippeon other images of gold and ivory, Eurydike the wife of Aridaios and Olympias the wife of Philip. There is also a chest made of cedar [the chest of Kypselos], with figures on it, some of ivory, some of gold, others carved out of the cedar-wood itself [...] There are here other offerings also : a couch of no great size and for the most part adorned with ivory; the quoit of Iphitos; a table on which are set out the crowns for the victors. The couch is said to have been a toy of Hippodameia. The quoit of Iphitos has inscribed upon it the truce which the Eleans proclaim at the Olympic festivals; the inscription is not written in a straight line, but the letters run in a circle round the quoit. The table is made of ivory and gold, and is the work of Kolotes [...] There are figures of Hera, Zeus, the Mother of the gods, Hermes, and Apollon with Artemis. Behind is the disposition of the games. On one side are Asklepios and Hygeia (Health), one of his daughters; Ares too and Agon (Contest) by his side; on the other are Plouton, Dionysos, Persephone and Nymphai, one of them carrying a ball.

==== The table of Colotes ====
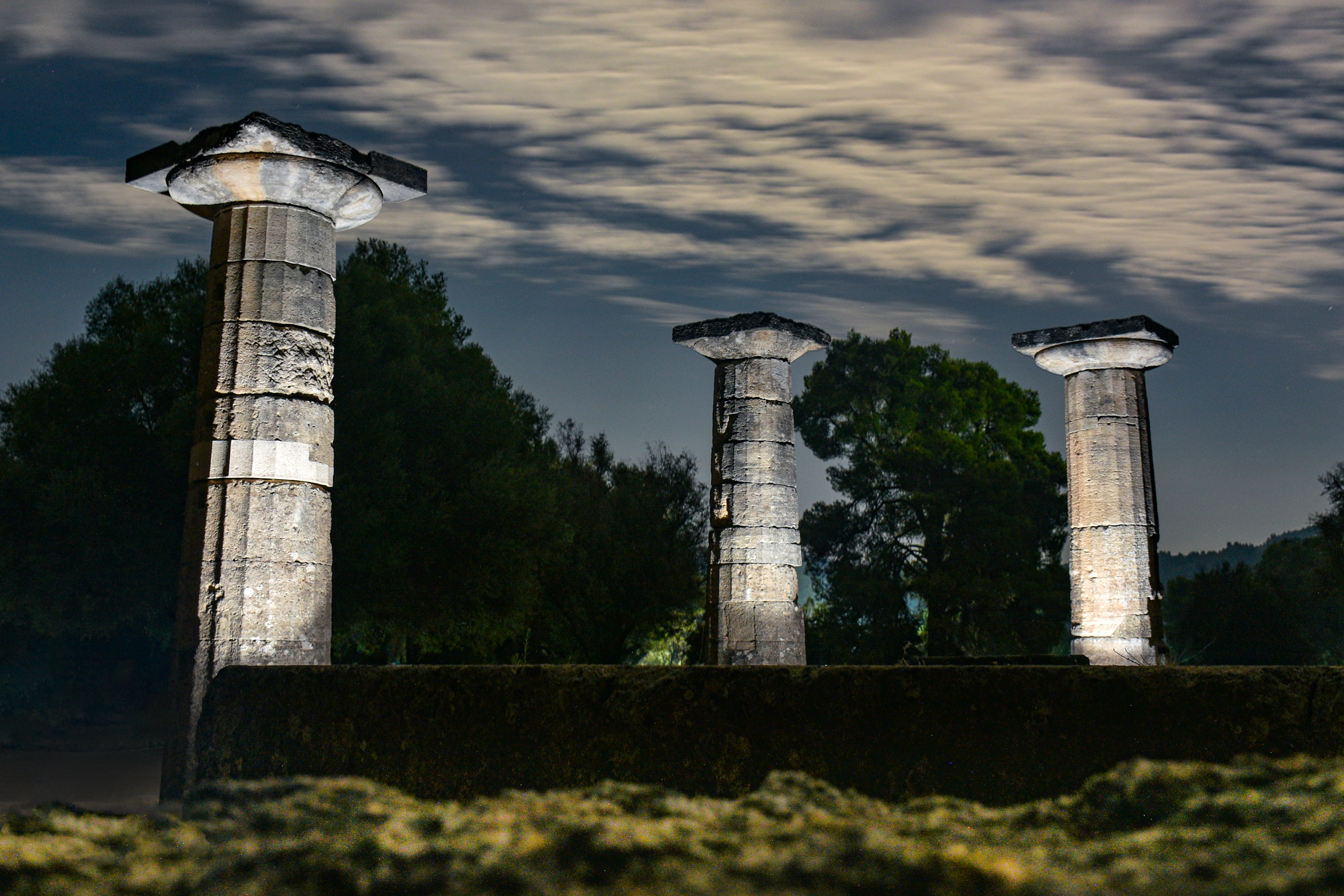
Temple in the night

The table was made with ivory and gold, and was sculpted by Colotes. It displayed the figures of Hera, Zeus, Rhea, Hermes, Apollo, and Artemis in front of the Games. On one side was Asclepius and his daughter Aceso, and Ares and the Olympian spirit of contest Agon. On the other were Pluto, Dionysos, Persephone and nymphs. The table bore the olive wreaths awarded to victors at the ancient Olympic Games

==== The Chest of Cypselus ====
The temple contained a cedar chest (Ancient Greek: κυψἐλη, romanized: kypsele) in which Cypselus, the tyrant of Corinth was reportedly hidden by his mother. The chest was reportedly dedicated at Olympia in gratitude to the gods, and so, according to folktale, Cypselus gained his name. According to Dio Chrysostom in the 1st century AD, the chest was found in the opisthodomos. The chest had various mythological figures inscribed on it in ivory, gold, or in the wood of the chest itself. Accompanying many of the figures were inscriptions in Corinthian (Doric) indicating their identity, some of the text being written boustrophedon in alternating directions.

== Legacy ==
Set apart from the temple at its eastern side is the Altar of Hera, where the Olympic flame has been lit since 1936 using a parabolic mirror to concentrate the rays of the sun.

The temple was depicted on the reverse of the Greek 1000 drachmae banknote of 1987–2001.

The Jasmine Hill Gardens at Wetumpka, Alabama (United States), contained a full-sized replica of the (ruined) Temple of Hera.

== See also ==
- List of Ancient Greek temples
- Architecture of Ancient Greece
- List of Greco-Roman roofs
