= Mobile Botanical Gardens =

Botanical gardens in Alabama

Coordinates: 30.69959°N 88.16146°W

The Mobile Botanical Gardens were founded in 1974, and are located on Museum Drive in the Spring Hill community in Mobile, Alabama, United States.

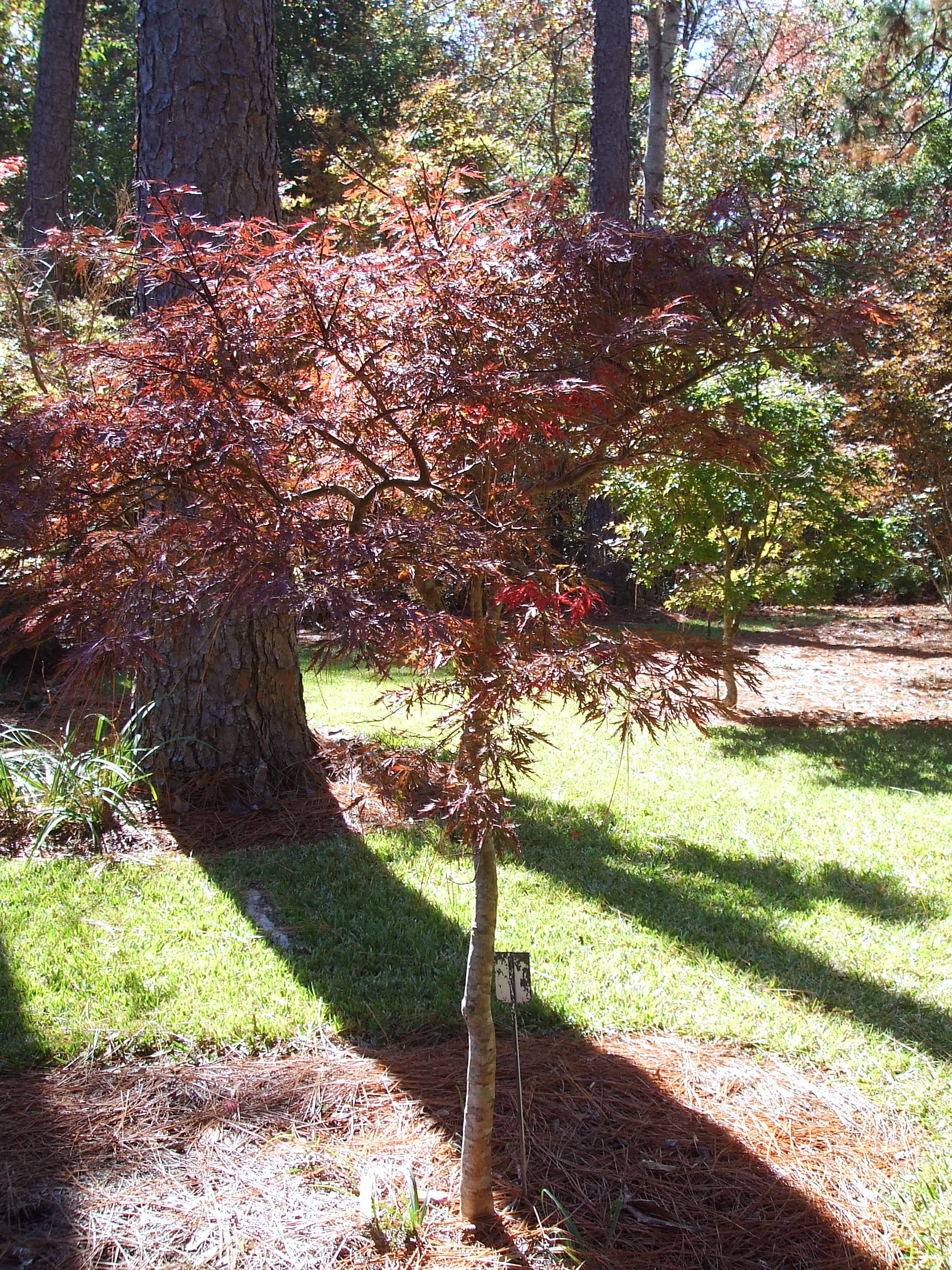
Mobile Botanical Gardens

== Description ==
The gardens are situated on 100 acres (0.40 km^{2}) and are a blend of cultivated areas and natural habitats, including the Rhododendron Garden, Camellia Wintergarden, Fern Glade, Fragrance and Texture Garden, Japanese Maple Garden, Herb garden, and a Longleaf Pine habitat of 40 acres (160,000 m^{2}).

The Rhododendron Garden contains eight collections of approximately 1,000 evergreen and native azaleas. The plantings were newly installed in 2006 within an older azalea garden. The collections here include Encore, Harris, Holly Springs, Mobile, National Arboretum Kurumes, Nuccio, Robin Hill, and Southern Indica. This is the most comprehensive rhododendron collection anywhere along the Gulf Coast. Another area of special note is the Longleaf Pine Habitat, a preserved remnant of the great southern longleaf pine (Pinus palustris) ecosystem that once dominated the American South. It is an extremely diversified habitat with 49 vascular plant families, 159 vascular plant species, 72 woody species, and 21 naturalized species cataloged in May and June 2007. Installed in 2007, the Camellia Wintergarden is a collection of 500 camellias, 350 newly planted, with 75 planted over thirty years ago.

Mobile Botanical Gardens is a 501(c)3 non-profit, and funding is mainly through contributions, grants, plant sales, and membership dues. It is open year-round from dawn to dusk. Admission is $5 for adults, children 12 and under are free.

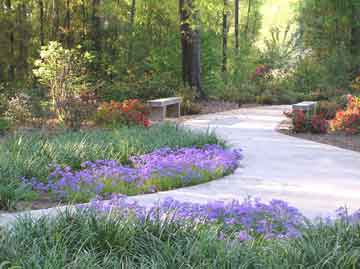
Rhododendron Garden

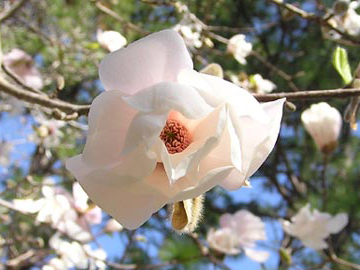
Magnolia 'White Stardust'

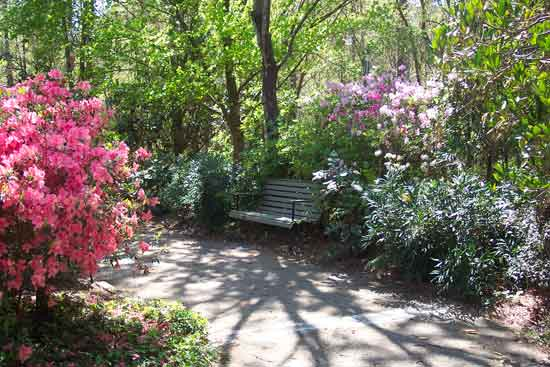
Fragrance and Texture garden

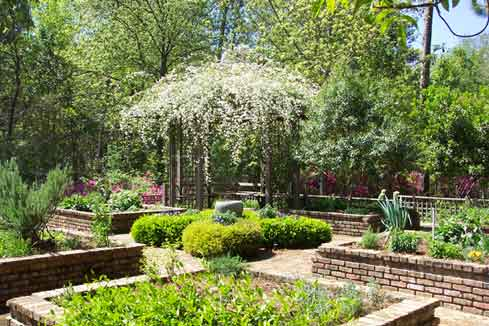
Herb Garden

== See also ==
- List of botanical gardens and arboretums in Alabama
