= Belarusian State Technological University =

University in Minsk, Belarus

Coordinates: 53°53′30″N 27°33′36″E

University rankings

Regional – Overall
- QS Emerging Europe and Central Asia: 201-210 (2022)

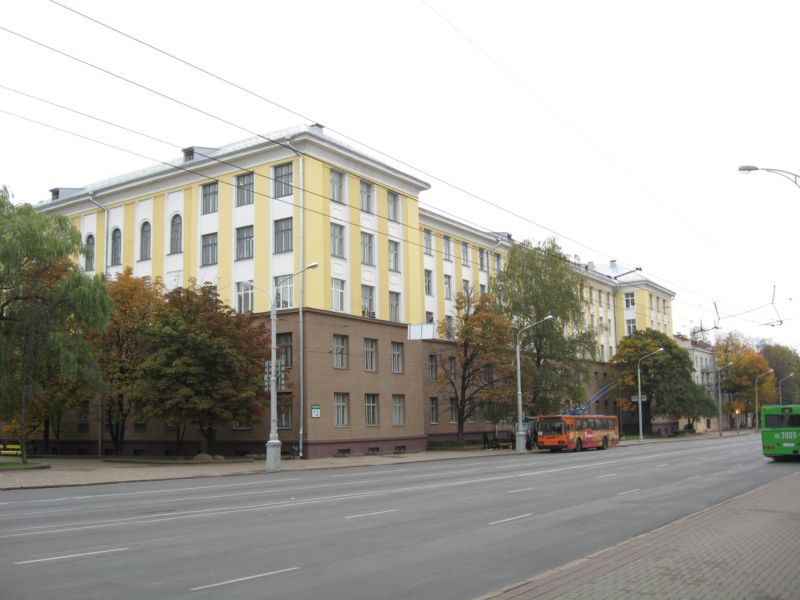
Belarusian State Technological University

Belarusian Technological Institute
Motto	With Work, with Knowledge, with Science
Established	1930
Location	Minsk, Belarus
Students	13000 total
Homepage	https://www.belstu.by/

Belarusian State Technological University (Russian: Белорусский государственный технологический университет; Belarusian: Беларускі Дзяржаўны Тэхналагічны Універсітэт, romanized: Bielaruski Dziaržaŭny Technalahičny Univiersitet) is a university in Minsk, Belarus specialized in engineering and technology. It was established in Gomel in 1930 as the Forestry Institute. In 1941, it was evacuated to Sverdlovsk, now Yekaterinburg. Returned to Gomel in 1944, but in 1946 relocated to Minsk as the Belarusian Technological Institute.

== Structure ==
- 47 departments
- 11 faculties
- Dean's office for foreign students
- Pre-University courses
- Negoreloe forestry experimental station
- Botanical garden
- Meteorological station
- Educational-production forest-processing complex
- Borisov educational-scientific experimental station
- Technological gymnasium

== Prominent alumni ==
- Stanislav Galaktionov — prominent Soviet and American biologist.
- Yuri Puntus — former BATE Borisov and Belarus national football team coach.
