= SS Prinz August Wilhelm =

German cargo liner

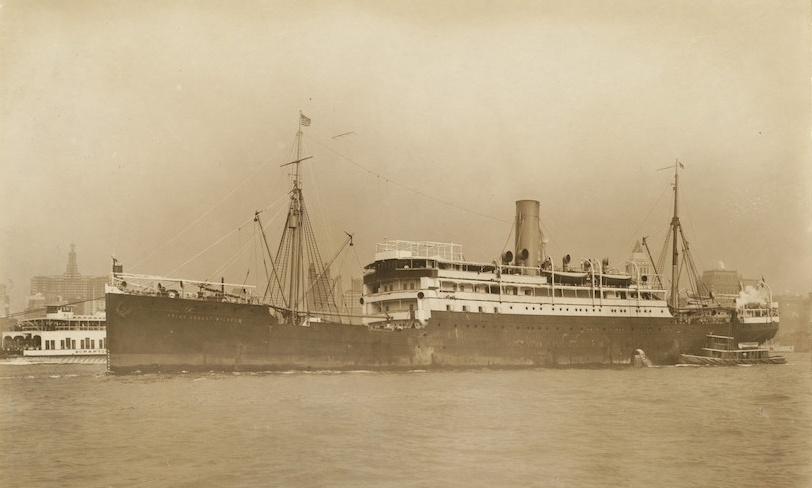
- Prinz August Wilhelm in port

History

Germany
- Name: Prinz August Wilhelm
- Namesake: Prince August Wilhelm of Prussia
- Owner: Hamburg America Line
- Port of registry: Hamburg
- Route: 1903: Hamburg – Mexico; 1906: New York – Caribbean
- Builder: Flensburger Schiffbau, Flensburg
- Yard number: 217
- Launched: 4 November 1902
- Completed: 16 May 1903
- Maiden voyage: 26 May 1903
- Out of service: from 1 August 1914
- Identification: code letters RMVB; by 1913: call sign DSB
- Fate: scuttled 22 April 1918

General characteristics
- Class & type: Prinz-class cargo liner
- Tonnage: 4,733 GRT, 2,775 NRT
- Length: 370.9 ft (113.1 m)
- Beam: 45.3 ft (13.8 m)
- Depth: 25.2 ft (7.7 m)
- Decks: 2
- Installed power: 381 NHP
- Propulsion: 1 × quadruple-expansion engine; 1 × screw
- Speed: 12 knots (22 km/h)
- Capacity: by 1912: 92,865 cu ft (2,630 m^{3}) refrigerated holds

SS Prinz August Wilhelm was a Hamburg America Line (HAPAG) cargo liner that was launched in Germany in 1902 and scuttled in Colombia in 1918. Her original route was between Hamburg and Mexico. From 1906 she served routes between New York and the Caribbean.

To avoid capture by the Entente Powers in First World War she sheltered in neutral Colombia from August 1914 until April 1918, when her crew scuttled her to prevent the United States Shipping Board (USSB) from seizing her. Her wreck remains in shallow water in Puerto Colombia. Artefacts recovered from it are in a museum in Barranquilla.

== Prinz-class ocean liners ==
Between 1901 and 1903 HAPAG had seven new cargo liners built, each named after a prince of the House of Hohenzollern. Five of them were single-screw, all built to the same dimensions, and formed a class. Reiherstieg Schiffswerfte & Maschinenfabrik in Hamburg built Prinz Eitel Friedrich and Prinz Waldemar. AG "Neptun" in Rostock built Prinz Sigismund. Flensburger Schiffbau-Gesellschaft in Flensburg built Prinz August Wilhelm and Prinz Joachim.

At the same time, Bremer Vulkan Schiffbau & Machinenfabrik in Bremen-Vegesack built Prinz Adalbert and Prinz Oskar. These were about 32 feet (10 m) longer and 4 feet (1.2 m) broader than the other five, and were twin-screw ships. They thus form either a sub-class or a separate class.

== Building ==
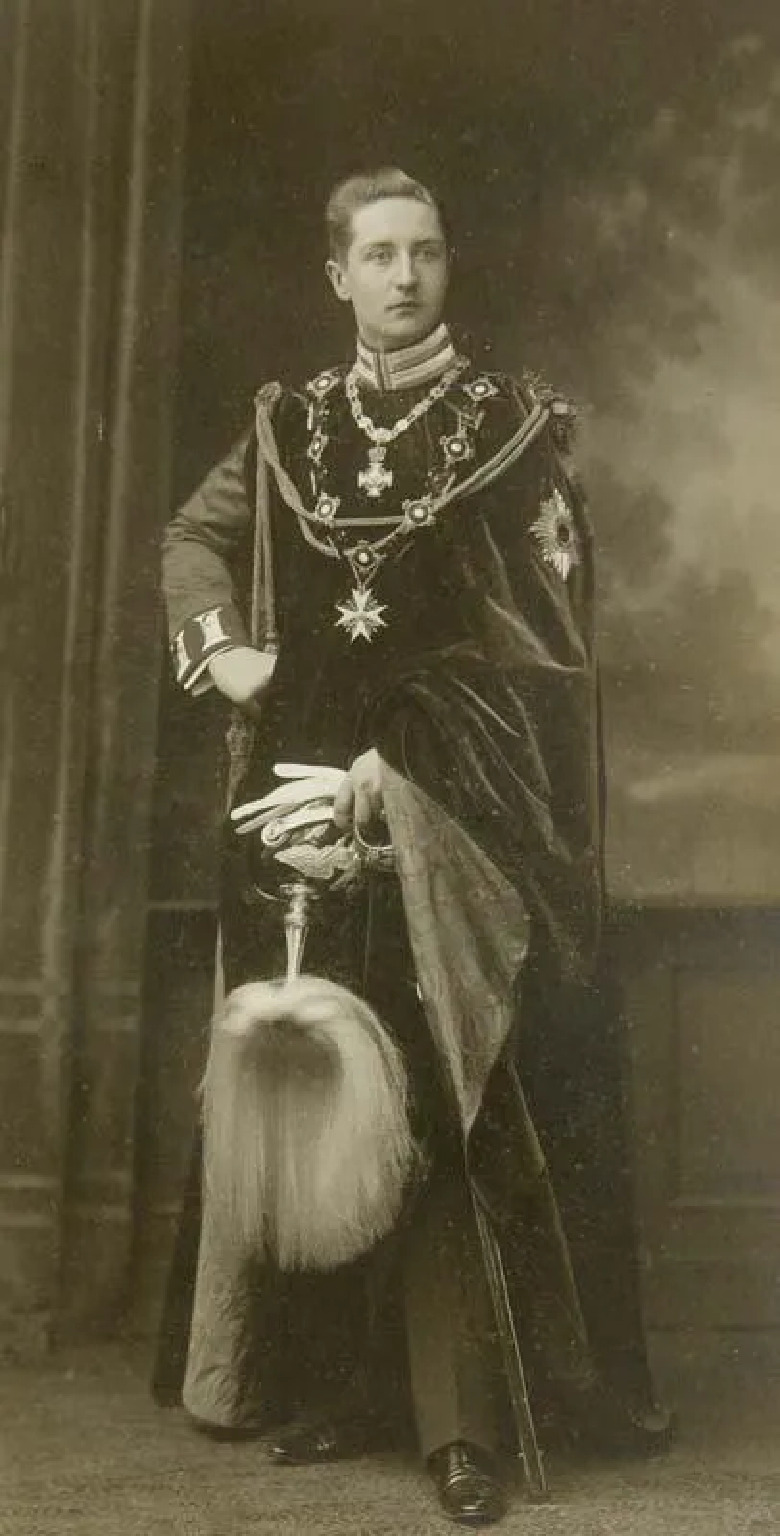
Prince August Wilhelm of Prussia

Flensburger Schiffbau built Prinz August Wilhelm and Prinz Joachim as yard numbers 217 and 218. They were almost identical. Prinz August Wilhelm was launched on 4 November 1902 and completed on 16 May 1903. She was named after Prince August Wilhelm of Prussia. Her registered length was 370.9 ft (113.1 m), her beam was 45.3 ft (13.8 m), and her depth was 25.2 ft (7.7 m). Her tonnages were 4,733 GRT and 2,975 NRT.

A quadruple-expansion engine drove Prinz Joachim's single screw. It was rated at 381 NHP and gave her a speed of 12 knots (22 km/h).

== Career ==
HAPAG registered Prinz Joachim at Hamburg. Her code letters were RMVB. On 26 May 1903 she left Hamburg on her maiden voyage, which was to Mexico.

In September 1905 the Royal Mail Steam Packet Company (RMSP) announced that it would start running a fast passenger service between New York and Jamaica. HAPAG responded by announcing that it would put Prinz August Wilhelm and Prinz Joachim on its Atlas Service, which ran various routes between New York and the Caribbean. In June 1906 HAPAG announced that it would transfer its cruise ship Prinzessin Victoria Luise to the New York – Jamaica route, and that Prinz Eitel Friedrich, Prince Waldemar, Prinz August Wilhelm, and Prinz Joachim would all work the route between New York and Colón via Kingston.

On 17 January 1907 Prinz Waldemar ran aground on a reef in Jamaica and was declared a total loss. Prinz August Wilhelm took 30 of her crew back to New York, where they arrived on 29 February. On 3 May Prinz August Wilhelm also grounded in Jamaica. However, she was on a mudbank in Kingston Harbour, and was refloated undamaged on 27 May.

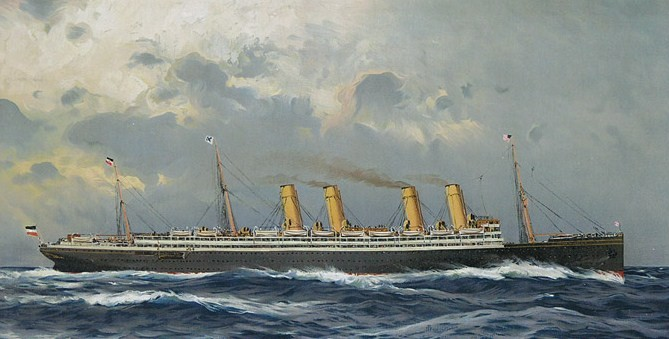
NDL's Kaiser Wilhelm II

On 25 February 1909 Prinz August Wilhelm was leaving New York in fog as the Norddeutscher Lloyd liner Kaiser Wilhelm II was coming into port. At about 07:30 hrs that morning Kaiser Wilhelm II was moving slowly in Gedney Channel when she sighted Prinz August Wilhelm ahead. Both ships took evasive action, and Kaiser Wilhelm II ran aground on a mudbank rather than hit Prinz August Wilhelm. Some of the passengers who saw the incident said that the ships cleared each other by less than 30 feet (9 m).

By 1910 Prinz August Wilhelm was equipped with wireless telegraphy. By 1913 her call sign was DSB. By 1912, 92,865 cubic feet (2,630 m^{3}) of her hold space was refrigerated, with machinery made by the American Linde Refrigerating Co.

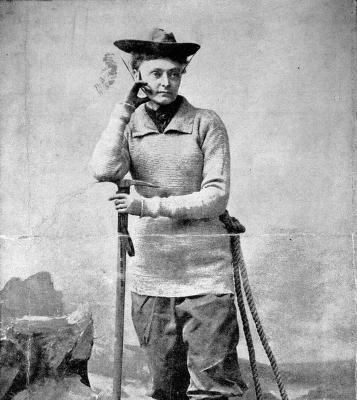
Annie Smith Peck

In 1911 the mountaineer Annie Smith Peck sailed on Prinz August Wilhelm from New York to Colón on her way to climb Coropuna in Peru. For the season from September 1912 to January 1913, HAPAG advertised Prinz August Wilhelm making round trips from New York to Fortune Island (now Long Cay), Santiago, Kingston, Colón, Bocas del Toro, and Puerto Limón.

== Laid up and scuttled ==
at 11:00 hrs on 1 August 1914, with the First World War imminent, HAPAG announced the suspension of its Atlas Service. Prinz August Wilhelm was in neutral Colombia, and HAPAG announced that she would remain there. Until November 1915 she was in Santa Marta. Her crew dwindled to 35 men, and both her Master and her doctor were taken ill. HAPAG sent a fresh captain by steamship from Colón to take command. He recruited six men from Curaçao as stokers, and on 12 November moved her along the Colombian coast to Sabanilla in Puerto Colombia to find a better anchorage. Sabanilla was also near a German community in Barranquilla.

In 1918 representatives of the USSB went to Colombia to take out a lien on Prinz August Wilhelm. They arrived in Barranquilla on 21 April, and arranged to take possession of the ship on 23 April. By then, her crew had dwindled to 19 men. On the night of 22 April, on the orders of her Master, Captain de Wall, they set her adrift, set her on fire, and opened her seacocks to scuttle her. She sank in shallow water, with her masts, funnel, and part of her superstructure remaining above water. De Wall and his crew abandoned ship, and were arrested and jailed.

Prinz August Wilhelm's wreck remains in the bay of Puerto Colombia, at a depth of 18 metres (59 ft). It is vulnerable to ocean dynamics, and to plunder, as it is near the shore, and unprotected by current Colombian law. Artefacts recovered from the wreck are now in the Museo Arqueologico de Pueblos Karib (MAPUKA) in Barranquilla.

== Bibliography ==
- Haws, Duncan (1980). The Ships of the Hamburg America, Adler and Carr Lines. Merchant Fleets in Profile. Vol. 4. Cambridge: Patrick Stephens Ltd. ISBN 0-85059-397-2.
- Lloyd's Register of British and Foreign Shipping. Vol. I.–Steamers. London: Lloyd's Register of Shipping. 1903 – via Internet Archive.
- Lloyd's Register of British and Foreign Shipping. Vol. I.–Steamers. London: Lloyd's Register of Shipping. 1910 – via Internet Archive.
- Lloyd's Register of British and Foreign Shipping. Vol. I.–Sailing Vessels, &c. London: Lloyd's Register of Shipping. 1912 – via Internet Archive.
- The Marconi Press Agency Ltd (1913). The Year Book of Wireless Telegraphy and Telephony. London: The St Katherine Press.
- Martín, Juan Guillermo; Espinosa, José Manuel; Roa, Eduardo; Blanco, Elías; Blanco, Julián (2017). "Arqueología Subacuática en Puerto Colombia. Avances sobre el vapor Prinz August Wilhelm" (PDF). Arqueología Iberoamericana. 36. ISSN 1989-4104.
- Rausch, Jane M (2016). "De la gloria al olvido: El hundimiento del vapor Prinz August Wilhelm en Puerto Colombia, 1918". The Hispanic American Historical Review. 96 (1). Durham, NC: Duke University Press.
- Yidi Daccarett, Enrique; Mendoza Arango, Alvaro (2014). De la gloria al olvido: El hundimiento del vapor Prinz August Wilhelm en Puerto Colombia, 1918 (in Spanish).
