= Otsego =

Otsego /ɒtˈsiːɡoʊ/ may refer to:

== Places ==
United States

- Otsego County (disambiguation)
- Otsego Township (disambiguation)
- Cities and towns:
  - Otsego, Michigan , a town
  - Otsego, Minnesota
  - Otsego, New York, a town
  - Otsego, Muskingum County, Ohio
  - Otsego, Wood County, Ohio
  - Otsego, Wisconsin, a town
    - Otsego (community), Wisconsin, an unincorporated community

== Ships ==
- SS Otsego, under that name a United States Army and Navy ship and cargo liner

== See also ==
- Otsego Lake (disambiguation)
- Otsego Hall, estate
- Otego (disambiguation)
