= SS Prinz Adalbert =

German-built cargo liner

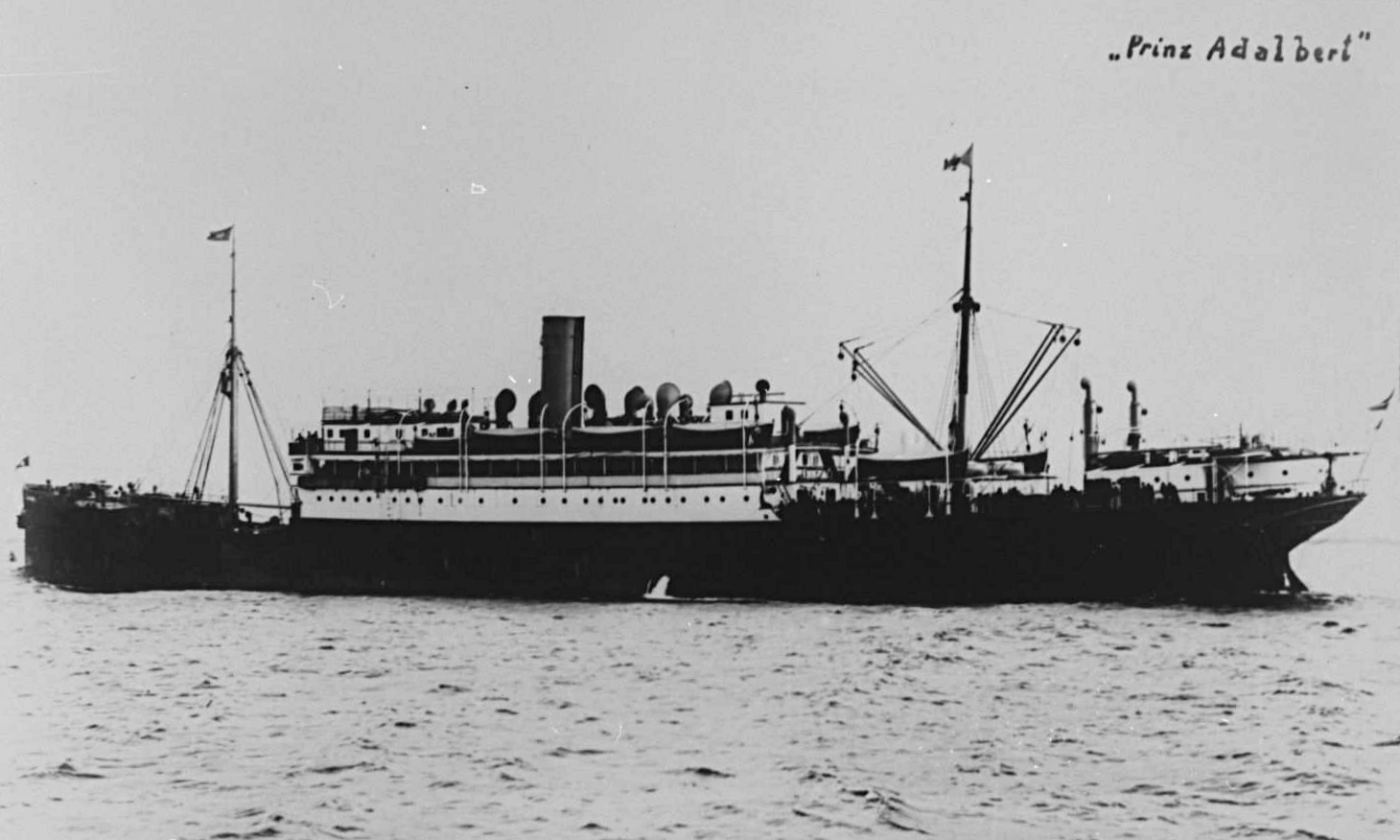
- Prinz Adalbert

History
- Name: 1902: Prinz Adalbert; 1914: Prince; 1916: Princetown; 1917: Alesia
- Namesake: 1902: Prince Adalbert of Prussia; 1916: Princetown; 1917: Alesia
- Owner: 1902: Hamburg America Line; 1917: C de N Sud-Atlantique
- Operator: 1914: (United Kingdom) Admiralty; 1915: Gellatly, Hankey & Co
- Port of registry: 1902: (German Empire) Hamburg; 1915: (United Kingdom); 1917: (France)
- Route: 1903: Hamburg – Brazil; 1903: Hamburg – Vera Cruz; 1904: Genoa – New York; 1906: Genoa – Buenos Aires; 1914: Hamburg – Philadelphia
- Builder: Bremer Vulkan, Vegesack
- Yard number: 450
- Launched: 21 August 1902
- Completed: 12 January 1903
- Maiden voyage: 20 January 1903: Hamburg – Brazil
- Identification: code letters RMSN; call sign DDZ
- Fate: Sunk by torpedo, 1917

General characteristics
- Type: cargo liner
- Tonnage: 6,030 GRT, 3,797 NRT, 6,150 DWT
- Length: 403.3 ft (122.9 m)
- Beam: 49.2 ft (15.0 m)
- Depth: 27.1 ft (8.3 m)
- Decks: 3
- Installed power: 402 NHP
- Propulsion: 2 × quadruple-expansion engines; 2 × screws
- Speed: 12 knots (22 km/h)
- Capacity: passengers: 120 × 1st class; 50 × 2nd class; 300 × 3rd class
- Sensors & processing systems: by 1910: submarine signalling
- Notes: sister ship: Prinz Oskar

SS Prinz Adalbert was a twin-screw cargo liner that was launched in Germany in 1902 for Hamburg America Line (HAPAG). In 1914 the United Kingdom Admiralty seized her and renamed her Prince. In 1916 she was renamed Princetown. On 1917 she was transferred to the Compagnie de Navigation Sud-Atlantique and renamed Alesia. Later in 1917 a U-boat sank her.

== Prinz-class cargo liners ==
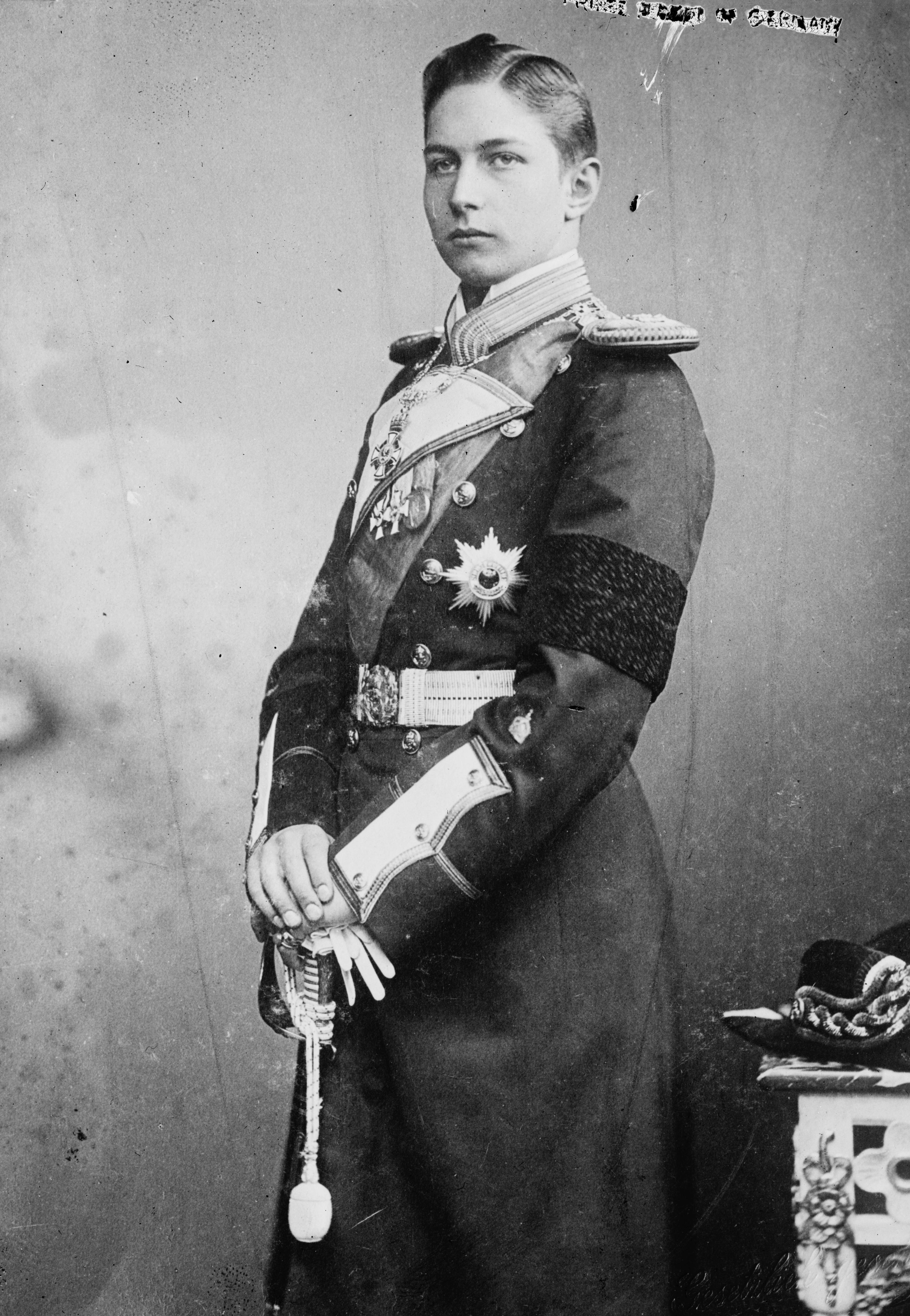
Prince Adalbert of Prussia

Between 1901 and 1903, HAPAG had seven new cargo liners built, each named after a prince of the House of Hohenzollern. Two were twin-screw ships, built by Bremer Vulkan Schiffbau & Machinenfabrik in Bremen-Vegesack. Prinz Adalbert was launched on 21 August 1902 and completed on 12 January 1903. Her sister ship Prinz Oskar was launched on 15 December 1902 and completed on 14 June 1903.

The other five formed a class of single-screw ships. Reiherstieg Schiffswerfte & Maschinenfabrik in Hamburg built Prinz Eitel Friedrich and Prinz Waldemar. AG "Neptun" in Rostock built Prinz Sigismund. Flensburger Schiffbau-Gesellschaft in Flensburg built Prinz August Wilhelm and Prinz Joachim.

Prinz Adalbert and Prinz Oskar were about 32 feet (10 m) longer and 4 feet (1.2 m) broader than the single-screw ships. The pair thus forms either a sub-class or a separate class.

== Description ==
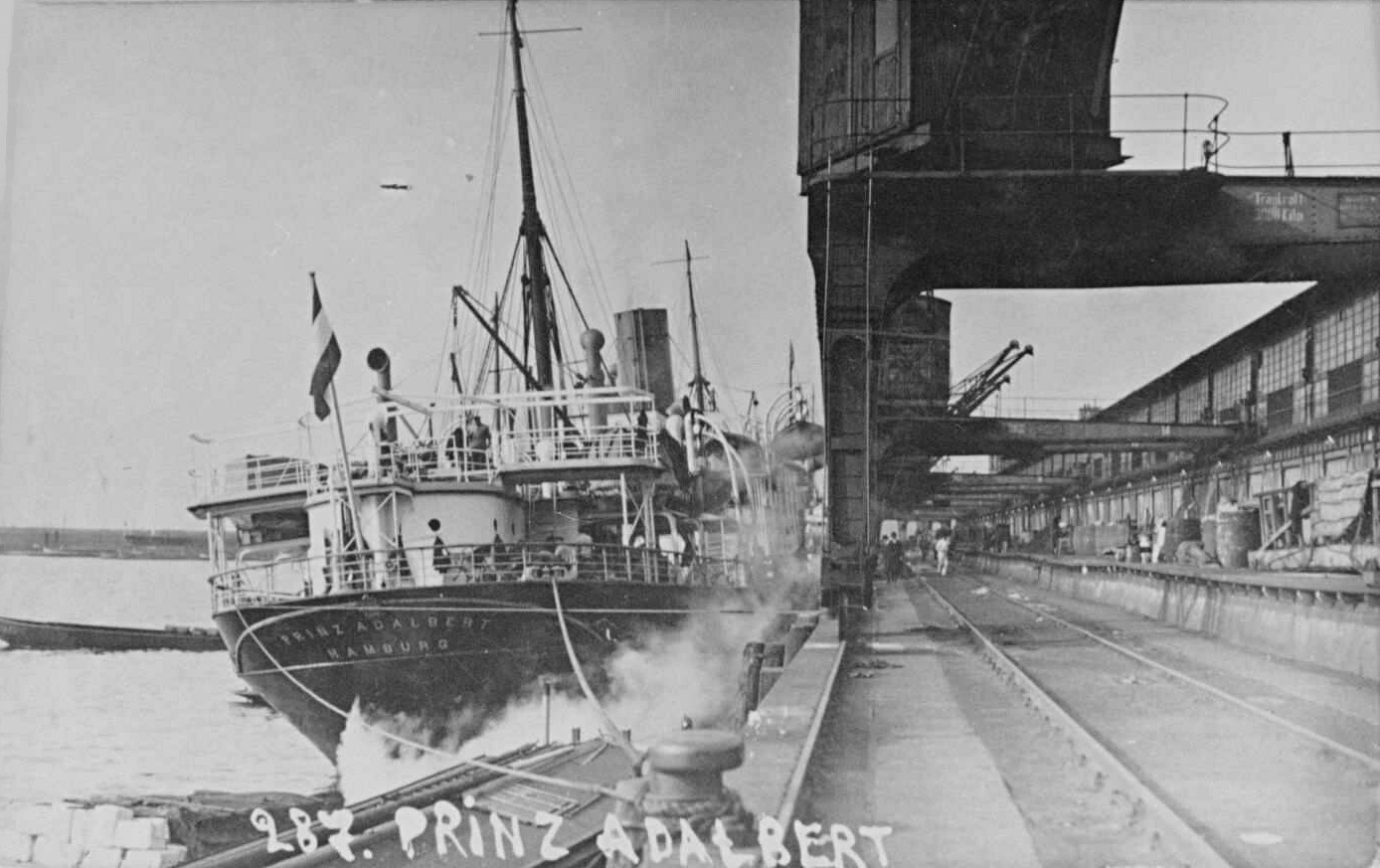
Prinz Adalbert in port

Prinz Adalbert was named after Prince Adalbert of Prussia. Her registered length was 403.3 ft (122.9 m), her beam was 49.2 ft (15.0 m), and her depth was 27.1 ft (8.3 m). Her tonnages were 6,030 GRT and 3,797 NRT. As built, she had berths for 470 passengers: 120 in first class, 50 in second class, and 300 in third class.

Prinz Adalbert had a pair of quadruple-expansion engines to drive her twin screws. Their combined power was rated at 402 NHP, and they gave her a speed of 12 knots (22 km/h).

== HAPAG career ==
HAPAG registered Prinz Adalbert at Hamburg. Her code letters were RMSN. On 20 January 1903 she left Hamburg on her maiden voyage, which was to Rio de Janeiro. Later that year she sailed from Hamburg to Mexico, on a direct service that did not call at ports in the West Indies.

In August 1904 HAPAG announced that from 1 October Prinz Adalbert and Prinz Oskar would serve its route between Genoa in Italy and New York via Naples. Steerage fares from New York would be $15 to Naples and Genoa, and $16 to Trieste in Italy and Fiume in Austria-Hungary (now Rijeka in Croatia). By 1905 the route included a call at Palermo in Sicily, on westbound voyages only. By 1906 her route was between Genoa and Buenos Aires in Argentina.

By 1910 Prinz Adalbert was equipped with submarine signalling and wireless telegraphy. At the end of 1910 she started serving Philadelphia.

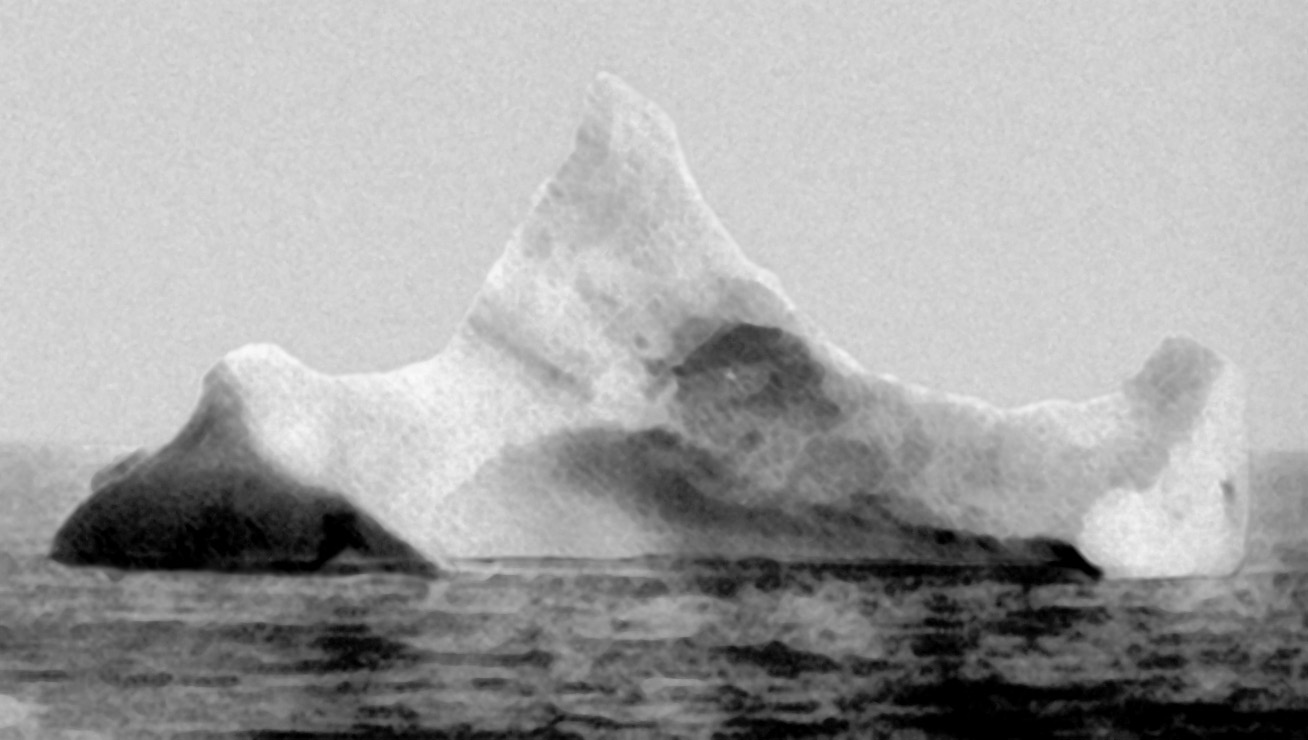
The Chief Steward's photograph of the iceberg suspected of sinking RMS Titanic

On 15 April 1912 she was in the North Atlantic when her chief steward photographed an iceberg. He wrote that "On one side red paint was plainly visible, which has the appearance of having been made by the scraping of a vessel on the iceberg." At the time, no-one aboard Prinz Adalbert' was aware that on the night of 14–15 April RMS Titanic had struck an iceberg and sunk.

By 1913 Prinz Adalbert's wireless call sign was DDZ. By 1914 she and Prinz Oskar served a North Atlantic route between Hamburg and Philadelphia, sometimes with an intermediate call at Emden.

On 3 August 1914 Germany declared war on Belgium and France, and the next day the United Kingdom declared war on Germany. Prinz Adalbert was in Falmouth, Cornwall at the time. Her Master was advised to put to sea, but he chose to keep his ship in Falmouth, where the Admiralty seized her.

== Allied career ==
Prinz Adalbert was renamed Prince, and on 17 December 1914 became a accommodation ship at Invergordon, Scotland. Later she was renamed Princetown and was converted into a repair ship. According to one source, in 1915 she was returned to merchant service, with Gellatly, Hankey & Co of London as her managers.

It was not until March 1916 that a prize court declared Princetown to be a prize ship. She was paid off on 20 October 1916 and disposed of for sale on 23 December 1916.

On 17 January 1917 Compagnie de Navigation Sud-Atlantique (CNSA) of Marseille bought her at auction in a damaged condition. CNSA had her reconditioned in England, and renamed her Alesia, after the town of Alesia in ancient Gaul.

In September 1917 Alesia left Bordeaux for Cardiff carrying coal and general cargo. On 5 September UC-69 torpedoed her 40 nautical miles (74 km) northwest of the island of Ushant in Brittany. Alesia was damaged but stayed afloat. The next day, still off Ushant, UC-50 torpedoed her, sinking her at position 48°49′N 05°00′W.

== Bibliography ==
- Bonsor, Noel RP (1983). South Atlantic Seaway: an illustrated history of the passenger lines and liners from Europe to Brazil, Uruguay, and Argentina. Jersey: Brookside Publications. ISBN 0-905824-06-7.
- Haws, Duncan (1980). The Ships of the Hamburg America, Adler and Carr Lines. Merchant Fleets in Profile. Vol. 4. Cambridge: Patrick Stephens Ltd. ISBN 0-85059-397-2.
- Lloyd's Register of British and Foreign Shipping. Vol. I.–Steamers. London: Lloyd's Register of Shipping. 1904 – via Internet Archive.
- Lloyd's Register of British and Foreign Shipping. Vol. I.–Steamers. London: Lloyd's Register of Shipping. 1910 – via Internet Archive.
- The Marconi Press Agency Ltd (1913). The Year Book of Wireless Telegraphy and Telephony. London: The St Katherine Press.
- The Marconi Press Agency Ltd (1914). The Year Book of Wireless Telegraphy and Telephony. London: The Marconi Press Agency Ltd.
- Rothe, Klaus (1986). Deutsche Ozean-Passagierschiffe 1896 bis 1918. Bibliothek der Schiffstypen (in German). Berlin: VEB Verlag für Verkehrswesen. ISBN 3-344-00059-4.
- Warlow, Ben (2000). Shore Establishments of the Royal Navy: being a list of the static ships and establishments of the Royal Navy (2nd ed.). Liskeard: Maritime Books. ISBN 0-907771-73-4.
