= SS Prinz Waldemar =

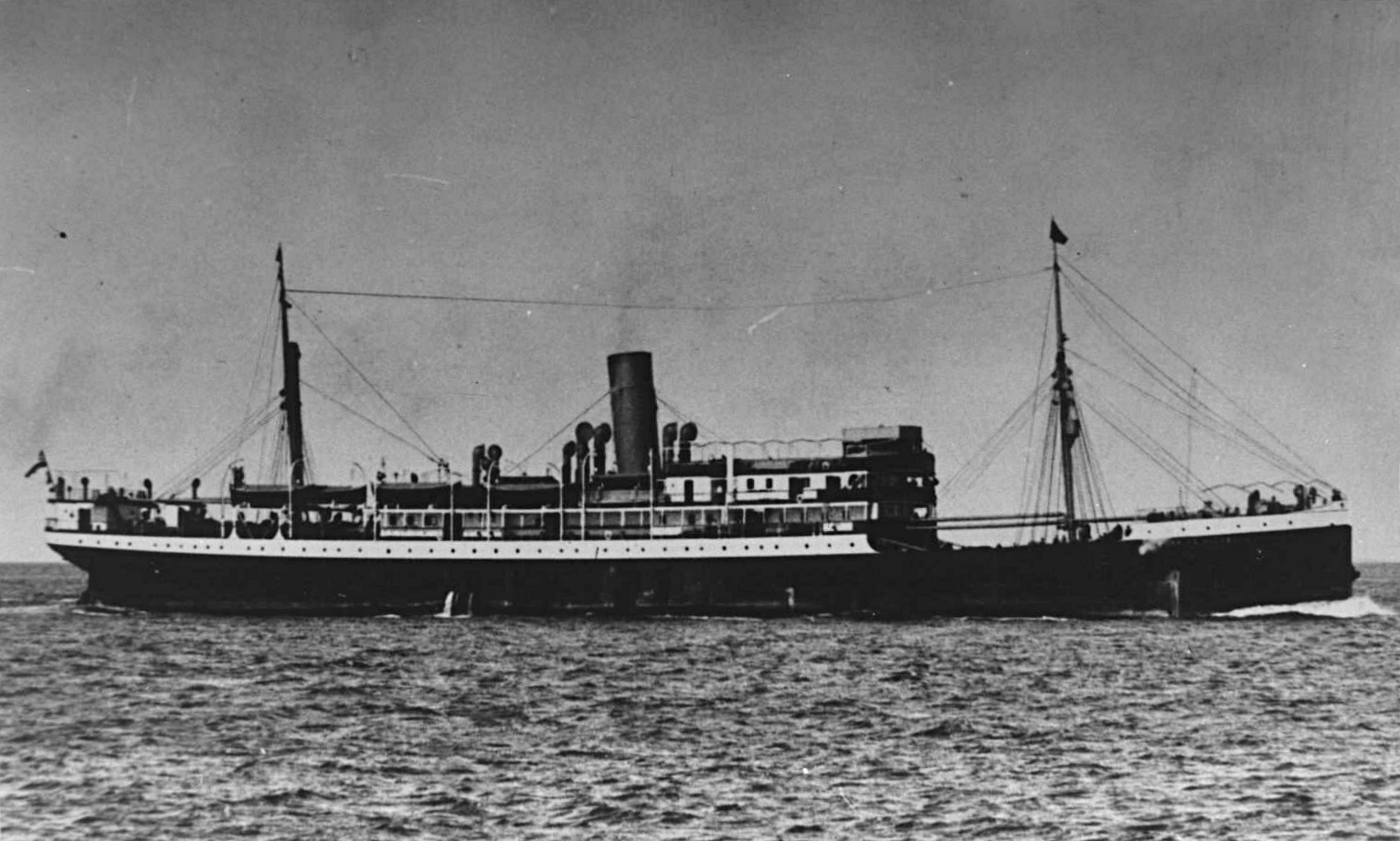
- Prinz Waldemar under way

History

German Empire
- Name: Prinz Waldemar
- Namesake: Prince Waldemar of Prussia
- Owner: Hamburg America Line
- Port of registry: Hamburg
- Builder: Reiherstieg S&M, Hamburg
- Yard number: 409
- Launched: 7 May 1902
- Completed: 23 August 1902
- Identification: code letters RMQK
- Fate: Wrecked, 17 January 1907

General characteristics
- Class & type: Prinz-class cargo liner
- Tonnage: 4,658 GRT, 2,926 NRT
- Length: 371.2 ft (113.1 m)
- Beam: 45.3 ft (13.8 m)
- Depth: 26.8 ft (8.2 m)
- Installed power: 318 NHP
- Propulsion: 1 × quadruple-expansion engine; 1 × screw
- Speed: 12 kn (22 km/h)

SS Prinz Waldemar was a steam cargo liner built in 1902 by the Reiherstieg Schiffswerfte & Maschinenfabrik of Hamburg for Hamburg America Line (HAPAG). She was named after Prince Waldemar of Prussia. The ship was primarily employed as a passenger and cargo carrier between Hamburg and South America during her career.

== Prinz-class cargo liners ==
In 1900 HAPAG established a route between Germany to the east coast of South America which at the time was served by the steamship Canadia, which was built in 1889. At the same time, the company ordered a class of five new single-screw ships, each of about 4,600 GRT, for the route, each named after a prince of the House of Hohenzollern.

Reiherstieg built the first two: Prinz Eitel Friedrich, launched in December 1901, and Prinz Waldemar, which was launched in May 1902. AG "Neptun" in Rostock built Prinz Sigismund. Flensburger Schiffbau-Gesellschaft in Flensburg built Prinz August Wilhelm and Prinz Joachim.

At the same time, Bremer Vulkan in Bremen built Prinz Adalbert and Prinz Oskar. These were slightly larger, had twin screws, and thus form either a sub-class or a separate class.

== Description ==
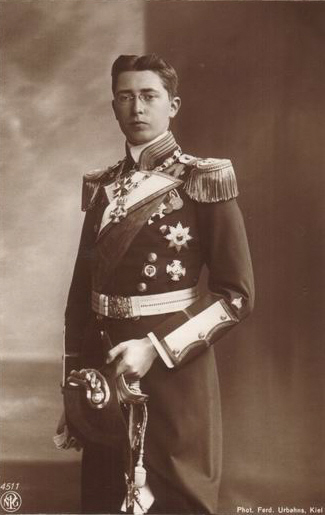
Prince Waldemar of Prussia

Reiherstieg built Prinz Waldemar as yard number 409. She was named after Prince Waldemar of Prussia, and launched on 7 May 1902. After her sea trials she was handed over to her owners on 23 August that year. She was primarily a cargo ship. She could carry 5,200 tons of cargo, for which she had eight derricks with steam winches. She also had 25 first class cabins, with berths for 60 to 100 passengers. They were all on the second deck, well above the waterline, so that ports could be kept open all the voyage except in very stormy weather. Each cabin had a heater and an electric fan. She could also carry about 560 third class passengers.

The ship was 371.2 ft (113.1 m) long between perpendiculars, 45.3 ft (13.8 m) abeam, and her depth was 26.8 ft (8.2 m). Prinz Waldemar's tonnages were 4,658 GRT and 2,926 NRT. She had a single screw, dirven by a quadruple-expansion steam engine. It was rated at 318 NHP, and gave her a speed of 12 kn (22 km/h).

== Career ==
After delivery Prinz Waldemar served the route between Hamburg and Brazil. On her outward trips she carried general cargo such as cheese, tea, cod, butter, cereals, wines, etc. On her return trips she carried coffee, and occasionally other agricultural products from Argentina and Uruguay, such as meat and cotton. Additionally, the ship carried immigrants to Brazil, mostly Portuguese who were embarked when she called at Lisbon. Prinz Waldemar left Hamburg on her maiden voyage on September 10, 1902, for Brazilian ports of Santos and Rio de Janeiro via Lisbon. She reached Rio de Janeiro on October 4, and continued to Santos the next day. After loading 48,622 bags of coffee she left Santos on October 22 for Europe.

HAPAG added ports of call such as Dover and Boulogne on her return trips from Brazil. However, in 1906 the Royal Mail Steam Packet Company entered the competition for trade between New York and West Indies, where HAPAG ran its own Atlas Service, acquired in 1901 from the United Fruit Company. Prinz Waldemar arrived in Rio de Janeiro for the last time on April 21, 1906. Late in the summer of 1906 she was transferred to the Atlas Service between New York City and the West Indies, calling at Kingston, Puerto Limón, Savanilla and Cartagena.

== Loss ==
Prinz Waldemar left New York City under command of Captain Paul Wintzer on December 29, 1906, for Kingston, where she arrived on January 4, 1907. She called at Savanilla, Cartagena, and Puerto Limón. On January 14, 1907, she left Puerto Limón for Jamaica where she was due on the afternoon of January 17. At about 15:32 local time on January 14, an earthquake struck the city, destroying among other things both Plum Point and Port Royal lighthouses at the entrance to the Kingston harbor.

Around 02:00 on January 17, 1907 Prinz Waldemar reached Plum Point, about 10 miles east of Kingston, and tried to enter the harbor. Without the lighthouse, the Captain mistook his course and the ship ran aground on a coral reef, about half-mile east northeast of the lighthouse, at about 17°55′55″N 76°46′18″W. Coincidentally, this was near where the HAPAG liner Prinzessin Victoria Luise went ashore on December 16, 1906. All crew and passengers safely disembarked. An attempt was made to refloat her, but on February 26, 1907, it was announced that HAPAG had abandoned salvage operations and the ship was declared a total loss. Prinz August Wilhelm took 30 of her crew back to New York, where they arrived on February 29.
