= SS Otsego =

German-built merchant steamship

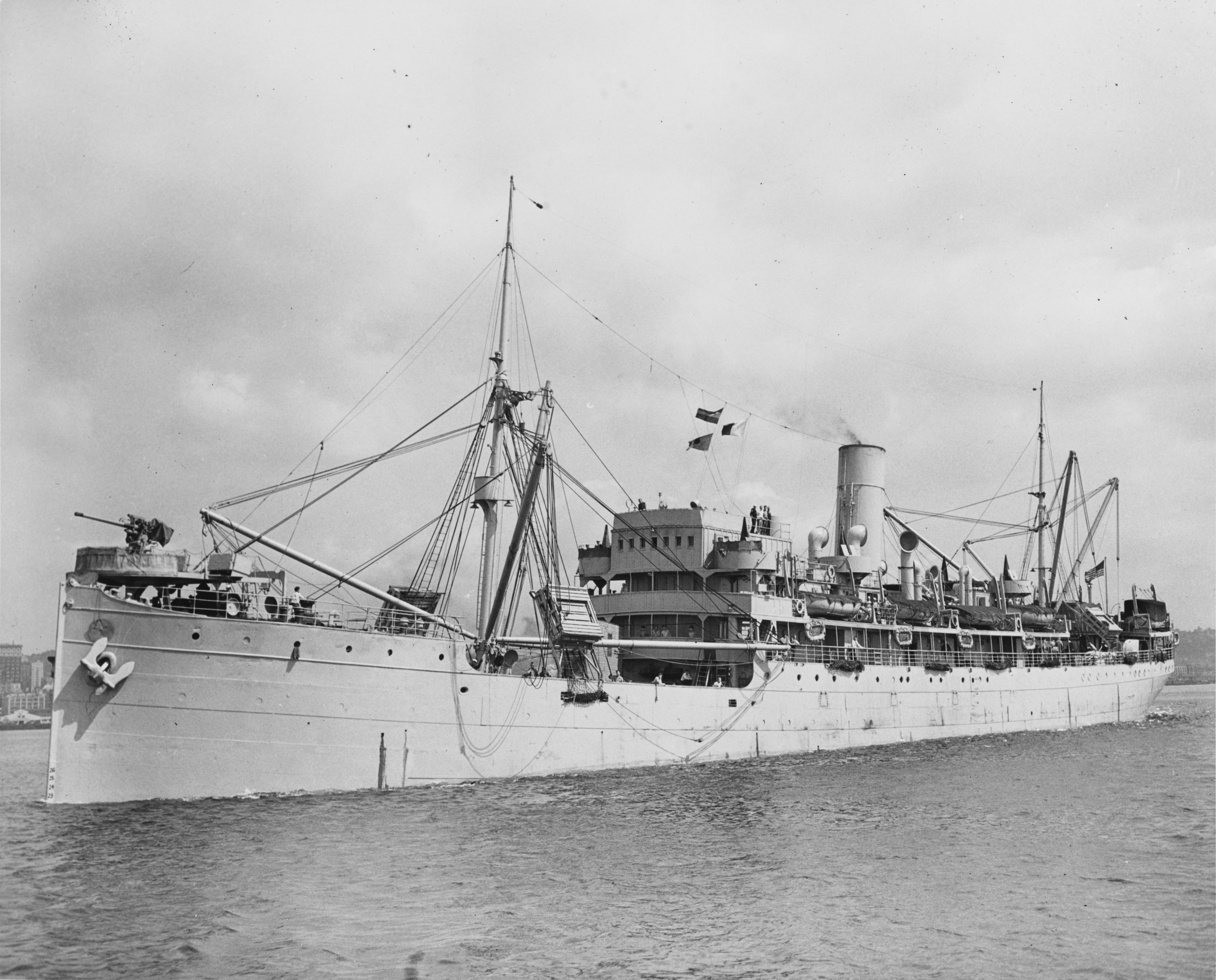
- The ship as USAT Otsego, August 1943

History
- Name: 1901: Prinz Eitel Friedrich; 1917: Otsego; 1945: Ural; 1947: Dolinsk
- Namesake: 1901: Prince Eitel Friedrich of Prussia
- Owner: 1902: Hamburg America Line; 1917: US Shipping Board; 1924: Libby, McNeill & Libby; 1945: Soviet Union
- Operator: 1919: United States Navy; 1921: Cosmopolitan Shipping Co; 1941: United States Army
- Port of registry: 1902: (German Empire) Hamburg; 1921: (United States) New York; 1924: (United States) San Francisco; 1945: (Soviet Union)
- Builder: Reiherstieg S&M, Hamburg
- Yard number: 408
- Launched: 21 December 1901
- Completed: 19 April 1902
- Commissioned: into US Navy: 10 March 1919
- Decommissioned: from US Navy: 28 August 1919
- Out of service: 1914–17; 1919–20; 1921–23
- Refit: 1919, 1920, 1924, 1942
- Identification: 1902: code letters RMLJ; 1913: call sign DSI; 1919: Naval Registry ID-1628; 1919: US official number 213813; 1919: code letters LJHB; 1934: call sign WQCJ
- Fate: Hulked or scrapped in 1955

General characteristics
- Class & type: Prinz-class cargo liner
- Tonnage: 4,650 GRT, 2,921 NRT
- Displacement: 8,755 long tons (8,895 t)
- Length: 371.0 ft (113.1 m)
- Beam: 45.3 ft (13.8 m)
- Draft: 25 ft 4 in (7.72 m)
- Depth: 26.8 ft (8.2 m)
- Depth of hold: 26 ft 8 in (8.13 m)
- Decks: 2
- Installed power: 2,400 ihp (1,790 kW)
- Propulsion: 1 × quadruple-expansion engine; 1 × screw
- Speed: 12 knots (22 km/h)
- Range: 11,000 nautical miles (20,000 km)
- Capacity: cargo: 152,209 cu ft (4,310 m^{3}); passengers: 1902: 100 1st class; 634 steerage; 1924: 219 cabin class; 214 dormitory class
- Troops: 1919: 28 officers; 984 enlisted; 1941: 793
- Complement: 1919: 28 officers; 168 enlisted
- Crew: 1902: 46; 1924: 63
- Sensors & processing systems: by 1910: submarine signalling

SS Otsego was a cargo liner that was launched in Germany in 1901 as Prinz Eitel Friedrich. The USA seized her in 1917 and renamed her Otsego. In 1919 she served in the United States Navy as USS Otsego (ID-1628). She spent the 1920s and 30s in merchant service as Otsego. In 1941 she became the United States Army ship USAT Otsego. In 1945 she was transferred to the Soviet Union, which renamed her Ural. In 1947 she may have been renamed Dolinsk. She was either hulked or scrapped in 1955.

For HAPAG Prinz Eitel Friedrich ran scheduled services between Hamburg and the east coast of South America until 1906, and then Atlas Caribbean cruises until 1914. She rescued US citizens from the 1907 Kingston earthquake in Jamaica. She was laid up in New York from the outbreak of the First World War in 1914 until the US seized German ships in its ports in 1917.

In 1917 the United States Shipping Board (USSB) assumed ownership of the ship and renamed her Otsego. She was in transatlantic war service as a merchant ship for the remainder of the war, and then in US Navy service as a troopship in 1919. She was converted to a pure cargo ship in 1920, but then laid up until 1923.

In 1924 Libby, McNeill & Libby bought her and had her refitted to carry passengers again. She carried supplies, canned salmon, and Libby's personnel, mostly between Seattle and Alaska, until 1941.

At the end of 1941 the War Shipping Administration chartered her for the US Army, who had her converted into a troopship. She carried troops and materiél between Seattle and Alaska until shortly before the end of the Second World War.

At the beginning of 1945 she was transferred under Lend-Lease to the USSR, which renamed her Ural. She operated in the Russian Far East. In 1947 she may have been renamed Dolinsk. She was either hulked or scrapped in or near Vladivostok in 1955.

== Prinz-class cargo liners ==
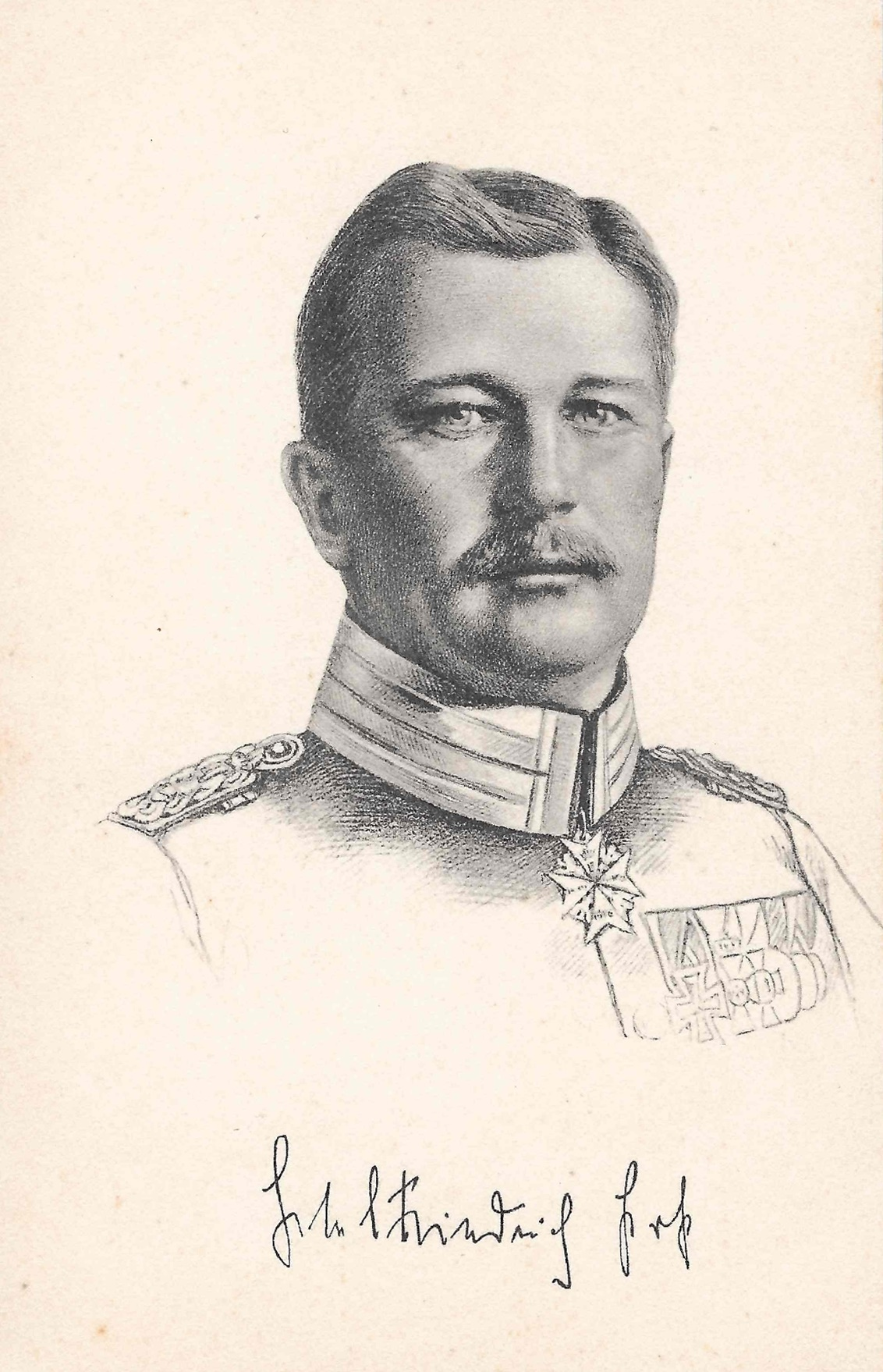
Prince Eitel Friedrich of Prussia

Prinz Eitel Friedrich was the first of a class of five single-screw steamships that German shipyards built between 1901 and 1903 for the Hamburg America Line (HAPAG). She was named after Prince Eitel Friedrich of Prussia. All were named after princes of the House of Hohenzollern. Reiherstieg Schiffswerfte & Maschinenfabrik built her in Hamburg as yard number 408. She was launched on 21 December 1901 and completed on 19 April 1902.

Reiherstieg also built Prinz Waldemar, which was launched in May 1902 and completed that August. AG "Neptun" in Rostock built Prinz Sigismund. Flensburger Schiffbau-Gesellschaft in Flensburg built Prinz August Wilhelm and Prinz Joachim.

At the same time, Bremer Vulkan in Bremen built Prinz Adalbert and Prinz Oskar. These were slightly larger, had twin screws, and thus form either a sub-class or a separate class.

== Description ==
Prinz Eitel Friedrich's registered length was 371.0 ft (113.1 m), her beam was 45.3 ft (13.8 m), her depth was 26.8 ft (8.2 m), her hold depth was 26 ft 8 in (8.13 m), and her draft was 25 ft 4 in (7.72 m). She had two continuous decks and nine watertight bulkheads. Her holds had capacity for 152,209 cu ft (4,310 m^{3}) of cargo. She had four cargo hatches: two forward, and two aft. Her tonnages were 4,650 GRT, 2,921 NRT, and 8,755 long tons (8,895 t) displacement.

As built, she had berths for 100 passengers in first class amidships, and 634 in steerage on the main deck. Her crew of 46 was quartered in her forecastle. Her public rooms included a dining saloon and small social hall, both on her promenade deck, and a smoking room aft of her engine room casing. She carried eight lifeboats on radial davits. She was noted for the "lavish use of mahogany on the wheelhouse and bridge fronts".

Her single screw was driven by a quadruple-expansion engine that was rated at 2,400 ihp (1,790 kW) and gave her a speed of 12 knots (22 km/h). Two double-ended, coal-fired Scotch boilers supplied steam at 220 psi (1,517 kPa). Her bunker capacity was about 1,400 tons, giving her a range of 11,000 nautical miles (20,000 km). She had one smokestack and two masts.

== HAPAG service ==
HAPAG registered Prinz Eitel Friedrich at Hamburg. Her code letters were RMLJ. Her first voyage or two were from Wilhelmshaven, Germany, to St. Thomas, Virgin Islands, cayying general cargo outbound and fresh fruit inbound. In June 1902 HAPAG transferred her to its route between Hamburg and Brazil. She remained on this route for the next four years.

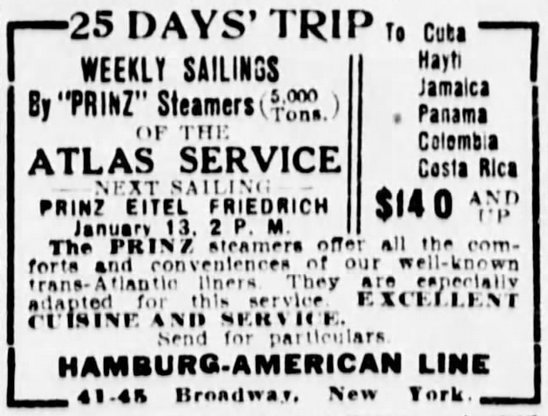
HAPAG advertisement for a 25-day Atlas cruise to the Caribbean aboard Prinz Eitel Friedrich, January 1912

In 1901 HAPAG had taken over the Atlas Line. In 1906 it transferred Prinz Eitel Friedrich to this service, as one of five ships offering winter cruises. To join this service she left Hamburg carrying 572 passengers, reaching New York on 26 April.

The Atlas Service eventually offered round trip cruises from New York of either 11, 18, or 25 days. with one ship leaving New York each week, By 1913 it had eight ships on this service.

Prinz Eitel Friedrich seems to have worked almost entirely on the 25-day cruises, usually with her sister ship Prinz Sigismund. Prospective customers were offered "accommodations equal to those of the well-known Trans-Atlantic liners of the Hamburg-American Line", and "excellent cuisine and service".

Cruise itineraries varied from year to year, but typically included Jamaica, Haiti, Cuba, Colombia, Costa Rica and Panama. From Panama, passengers were offered a connecting service to Peru and Chile. The call at Panama was usually a two- or three-day stay, with optional shore excursions, while ships exchanged cargoes and connecting passengers. The Panama Canal was still being built, and HAPAG ships often brought construction supplies. (Note: Examples:)

In her first winter cruise season, Prinz Eitel Friedrich encountered the aftermath of the 1907 earthquake in Jamaica. She left Colón, Panama on 12 January 1907, and was due in Kingston, Jamaica on 14 January when the earthquake struck, killing 1,745 people and causing much destruction. She was at first misreported to have been stranded in the harbor along with several other ships. In fact it was her sister ship Prinz Waldemar that ran aground, and was written off as a total loss.

Over the next three days, Prinz Eitel Friedrich embarked 160 US refugees. With her first-class cabins "taxed to their capacity". On 23 January, she became the first ship to reach New York from the disaster. On arrival, her passengers passed a resolution condemning the British authorities in Jamaica for "inactivity and utter inefficiency" after the earthquake, and alleged neglect of US citizens in favour of British refugees. (Note: The American refugees were particularly scathing in their criticism of Captain Parsons, commander of the British ship Port Kingston in Kingston Harbour, whom they accused of neglecting to provide any sort of assistance. A very different perspective of the role of Port Kingston in the crisis is provided in the account of Arthur Evans, a medical doctor aboard the ship. He reported that the vessel was overwhelmed with casualties within an hour of the earthquake, and that the ship's crew were "unremitting" in providing aid, with Evans himself performing some 200 medical procedures, including numerous amputations, over the next few days.)

By 1910 Prinz Eitel Friedrich was equipped with submarine signalling and wireless telegraphy. By 1911 HAPAG was running Atlas Line cruises all year round. Fares started at about $115 for summer cruises and $135 to $150 for winter ones. In February 1914 Michel Oreste, President of Haiti, abdicated in the face of advancing rebels, and with his family and entourage fled aboard Prinz Eitel Friedrich. They disembarked at Kingston on 9 February.

By 1913 Prinz Eitel Friedrich's wireless telegraph call sign was DSI.

On 1 August 1914, with the First World War imminent, HAPAG announced the immediate suspension of Atlas Line services. HAPAG ships already in US ports were ordered to remain there, and ships in transit to a US port were ordered to complete their voyage and then cease operation. On 4 August Prinz Eitel Friedrich was still in transit from the Bahamas to New York. She hugged the New Jersey coast for the remainder of the voyage, staying within the neutral US' three-mile territorial limit to evade capture by Allied naval ships. Before dawn on 5 August, with all but her navigation lights covered, she entered New York Harbor. She remained there for the next two years and eight months. (Note: The source erroneously states that Prinz Eitel Friedrich was already in port in New York when the war broke out, a statement disproven by contemporary newspaper reports.)

== Seizure and First World War service ==
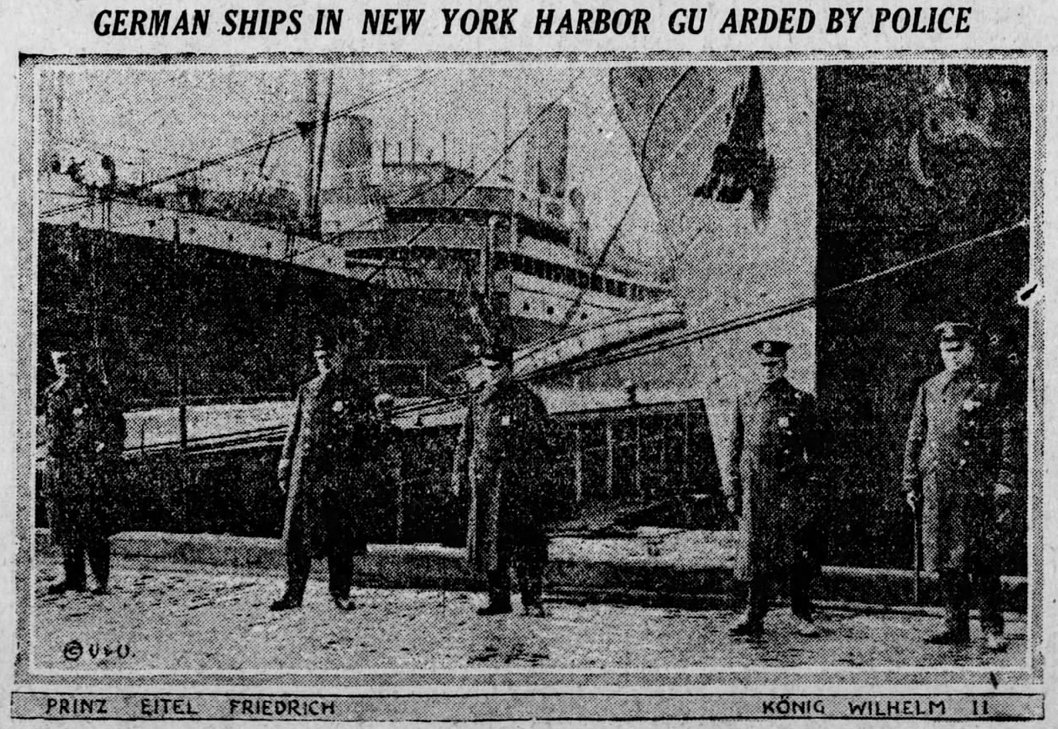
Police guarding HAPAG ships in New York, February 1917. They are standing in front of the bow of König Wilhelm II (right). In the background are Prinz Joachim (left) and Prinz Eitel Friedrich (center).

On 3 February 1917 the US broke diplomatic relations with Germany over the latter's resumption of unrestricted submarine warfare. Shortly after, a police guard was posted over German ships interned in New York Harbor. On 6 April the US declared war on Germany and seized more than 90 German ships, including Prinz Eitel Friedrich. The German crews were interned, and the ships were turned over to the USSB for possible war use. Shortly after, the USSB changed her name from Prinz Eitel Friedrich to Otsego. (Note: The ship was named after various counties and towns in the United States.)

During the war Otsego took US munitions and materiel to Europe, and carried some troops. After the war the foreign contingent of the US Cruiser and Transport Force withdrew, so the US Navy rapidly expanded its troop transport fleet to return troops to the United States. Otsego was one of 56 ships in US government possession selected for conversion to troopships. From 15 January to 3 March 1919 the W. & A. Fletcher Company of Hoboken, New Jersey converted her for $144,000. While still being converted, she was transferred to the US Navy on 7 February and commissioned the same day as USS Otsego (ID-1628). The conversion gave her a troop capacity of 28 officers and 984 enlisted men, and a crew complement of 21 officers and 168 enlisted men. (Note: A crew complement of 203 according to DANFS.)

Otsego was assigned to the Newport News Division of the Cruiser and Transport Force.She made four round-trips to repatriate troops from France to the US between 10 March and 28 August 1919. On her first crossing, she carried hay and automobile parts to Le Verdon-sur-Mer and returned with 1,036 officers and men of the 19th, 20th, 30th, 35th, 36th, and 45th Balloon Companies from Bordeaux to New York 18 April. Her passengers on this voyage included 74 men convalescing from illness or wounds, most of whom had had a leg amputated.

On her next trip from France, Otsego left Bordeaux on 11 May with 24 officers and 987 enlisted men, including headquarters and medical detachments of the First Battalion and Companies A, B, and C of the 311th Regiment, 78th Division, arriving New York 26 May. She had been expected on 23 May but was delayed for four days by boiler trouble, apparently disrupting the plans of New Jersey Governor William Nelson Runyon, who had travelled to Brooklyn on 23 May to welcome her. However, she had a warm welcome on 26 May, greeted by a fleet of steamers "with bands playing and flags flying and banners indicating the different towns from which they hailed", while soldiers aboard Otsego "swarmed the decks cheering and seeking and finding their relatives in the aquatic escort". The returning soldiers on this voyage included seven men awarded the Distinguished Service Cross.

Otsego's third voyage returned 1,020 troops to Charleston, South Carolina on 2 July, comprising mostly supply and transport units and "749 negro enlisted men". Her final voyage from France returned 392 officers and men from a variety of supply, medical, veterinary, and other units, reaching New York on 28 August. Among those returning on this voyage was William J Long, the American Expeditionary Force's doughnut-eating champion, credited with eating 249 doughnuts (Note: Actually French crullers) in a single 24-hour period during a 4 July contest. His rival went to the hospital after eating 189.

On return to New York on 28 August, Otsego was decommissioned from the Navy and detached from the Cruiser and Transport Force the same day. She was delivered to the USSB at New York 19 September 1919. In her brief naval career she repatriated 3,446 troops from France to the US, including 79 sick or wounded.

== Failed plans and lay-up ==
By June 1919 Otsego's United States official number was 213813, her code letters were LJHB, and she was registered in New York. She was among 19 decommissioned German ships that the US government at first planned to auction. However, on 5 November 1919 the USSB contracted J. W. Millard & Bro, naval architects, to redesign her as a "modern passenger ship". (Note: The source erroneously states that the contract was awarded to Merrill-Stevens. In fact the USSB rejected all offers.) The Board accepted the proposed redesign on 10 February 1920, but the ship was auctioned on 17 February. The auction closed unsuccessfully, having attracted only a single bid for any of the 19 ships. The Acme Operating Corporation offered $550,000 for Otsego, which was rejected.

The USSB proceeded with its alternative plan for Otsego, inviting tenders for her refit as a passenger ship ase designed by Millard. Tenders were received ranging from $970,000 to $1,477,576, but on 25 March the USSB rejected them all. On 17 May Otsego was towed to Portsmouth Navy Yard "to be reconditioned for cargo-carrying purposes only", with the work expected to completed by September. The refit included replacing her original boilers with three new Foster water-tube boilers; and reconditioning of her engine, propeller shaft and auxiliary engines. (Note: The source erroneously describes Otsego as a "twin-screw" ship.)

After her refit as a cargo ship, Otsego and five other former German ships were auctioned again on 10 June 1921. This time none of the vessels attracted a bid. In late June the USSB chartered Otsego to the Cosmopolitan Steamship Company, a French-American company, to test the competition on a direct route between Boston, Massachusetts and Liverpool, England. She left New York, and on 8 July arrived at Boston, where she loaded 200,000 bushels of oats for Dunkirk, France, plus general cargo for Liverpool. She left Boston on or about 18 July. By late August the ship was back in New York, where, having made only one round trip for Cosmopolitan Line, she was withdrawn from the service due to "depressed market conditions". Having exhausted its options, the USSB laid Otsego up. She remained laid up for the next two years and five months.

== Libby's service ==
On 29 January 1924 the canned food company Libby, McNeill & Libby bought Otsego. It sent a crew to New York to bring the ship to Seattle, Washington. The Master was a Captain Neilson, and some of his crew were laid-off workers from Libby's salmon canneries in Alaska. They brought Otsego via Baltimore, Newport News, the Panama Canal, Los Angeles and San Francisco, and reached Seattle on 6 April 1924.

Salmon canning was seasonal. Otsego's main duty was to make a single round trip per year, taking packing supplies, cannery workers and provisions from Seattle to Alaska each spring, and canned salmon and returning employees to Seattle each fall. The company had previously used two slow motorboats and a small fleet of ageing sailing ships for this.

Otsego was refitted again for her new role. New cabin berths were added, and her steerage was upgraded for cannery workers and fishermen. This gave her a total of 219 cabin berths and 214 dormitory berths. A new deck was added above the steering engine house at her stern, and the mahogany on the wheelhouse and bridge fronts was restored. Her radial lifeboat davits were also gradually replaced with more modern luffing davits when circumstances allowed. She was registered in San Francisco.

After a trial trip on Puget Sound, Otsego entered service on 11 May, bound for Bristol Bay, Alaska. Throughout Libby's service, she was manned largely by the company's fishermen and cannery workers rather than professional seamen, an arrangement later became unviable due to unionization. After arrival at Bristol Bay, most of the 63-man crew would go ashore with the other employees to work "day and night" to finish the season's canning, leaving only a skeleton crew to tend the ship. Returning to Seattle on 20 August, Otsego showed her advantages by making two more trips to Bristol Bay the same season, something "unheard of in the trade at the time". In her second season for Libby's, she towed the old sailing ship Oriental both ways on the latter's final voyages.

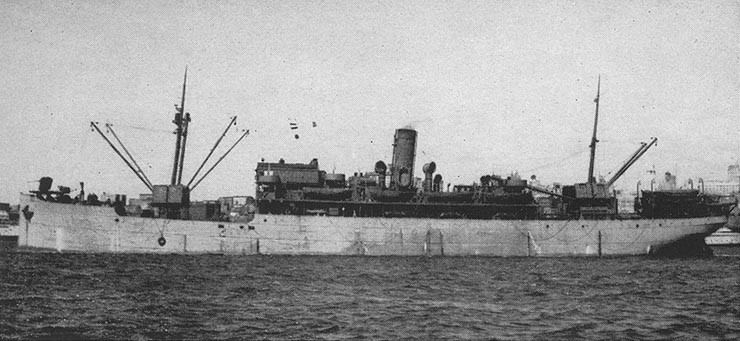
Sister ship General W. C. Gorgas, formerly Prinz Sigismund

In 1926 Libby's bought Otsego's sister ship Prinz Sigismund, by then called General W. C. Gorgas. In 1936 the company bought a third ship for the fleet, Santa Olivia, and renamed her David W. Branch. By 1934 Otsego's call sign was WQCJ, and this had superseded her code letters.

Otsego suffered few accidents in her long career with Libby's. On 7 August 1933 she went aground in dense fog when heading for Shilshole Bay. She was refloated the next day by the tugboat Creole. On 31 July 1934 Otsego, carrying some 600 cannery workers and a full cargo of canned salmon, struck a rock off Cape Mordvinof in Bristol Bay. She was refloated, but was leaking badly. The next day the United States Coast Guard cutters Ewing and Bonham escorted her to Dutch Harbor, where her passengers and cargo were transferred to other ships. After temporary repairs, Otsego returned to Seattle escorted by the cutter Shoshone. At Seattle the Todd Corporation repaired or replaced about 70 of her hull plates.

In her 18 years of Libby's service Otsego made 42 shorter trips as well as her annual round trips to Alaska. Her total number of trips was about 60. The final one ended at Lake Union on 30 August 1941. The States Steamship Company of Portland, Oregon was going to charter her, but before she could be transferred, the War Shipping Administration (WSA) chartered her, and then the US Army in turn chartered her from the WSA. This was on 4 December, three days before the attack on Pearl Harbor that brought the US into the Second World War.

== Second World War service ==
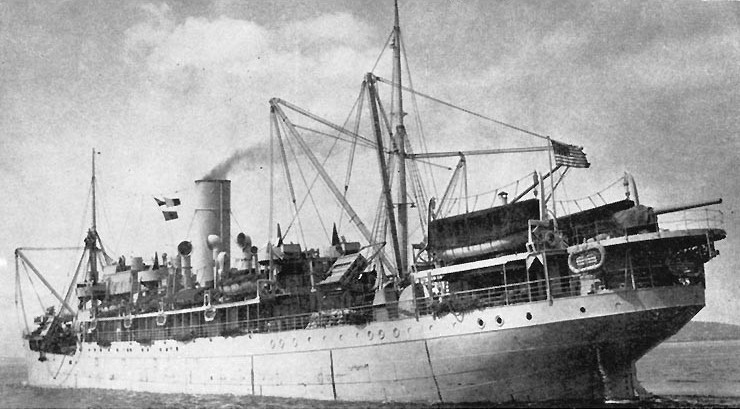
The ship as USAT Otsego

On 19 December 1941 the ship left Seattle on her first voyage as USAT Otsego. From April to July 1942 she was refitted at Seattle as a troopship with berths for 793 troops. Her service speed by this time was listed at 10 1/2 knots (19 km/h).

USAT Otsego was based at Seattle and spent the next 2½ years as an Army transport in "arduous" service to and from "most of the important ports and military bases in Alaska", making 31 voyages from 1941 through 1944. On 9 December 1944 she was returned to the War Shipping Administration.

== Soviet service ==
Before the end of the war, unionization had made Libby's private fleet uneconomic and the company had no further use for her. In January 1945 he was transferred under Lend-Lease to the USSR, who renamed ner Ural. She was placed under the control of the Far Eastern Steamship Company of Vladivostok and may have been used to carry political prisoners, forced laborers, and criminals from the eastern termini of the Trans-Siberian Railway to camps in Kamchatka and Northeast Siberia.

In 1947 Ural was reportedly renamed Dolinsk; She was either hulked or scrapped in the region of Vladivostok in 1955. Her sister ship General W. C. Gorgas had also become a US Army troop transport in 1941, and the Soviet Lend-Lease ship Mikhail Lomonosov in 1945. Mikhail Lomonosov was scrapped in the USSR in March 1958.

== Bibliography ==
- American Bureau of Shipping (1919). 1919 Record of American and Foreign Shipping. New York: American Bureau of Shipping – via HathiTrust.
- Charles, Roland W (1947). Troopships of World War II. Washington, DC: The Army Transportation Association – via HathiTrust.
- Evans, AJ (9 February 1907). "Experiences during the recent earthquake in Jamaica". British Medical Journal. 1 (2406). London: 348. doi:10.1136/bmj.1.2406.348. PMC 2356668. PMID 20763070.
- Gleaves, Albert (1921). A History of the Transport Service. New York: George H. Doran Company – via HathiTrust.
- Haws, Duncan (1980). The Ships of the Hamburg America, Adler and Carr Lines. Merchant Fleets in Profile. Vol. 4. Cambridge: Patrick Stephens Ltd. ISBN 0-85059-397-2.
- Johnson, Eads, ed. (1920). Johnson's Steam Vessels of the Atlantic, Gulf and Pacific Coasts. New York: Eads Johnson, M.E. Inc. – via HathiTrust.
- Lloyd's Register of British and Foreign Shipping. Vol. I.–Steamers. London: Lloyd's Register of Shipping. 1904 – via Internet Archive.
- Lloyd's Register of British and Foreign Shipping. Vol. I.–Steamers. London: Lloyd's Register of Shipping. 1910 – via Internet Archive.
- Lloyd's Register of Shipping. Vol. II.–Steamers. London: Lloyd's Register of Shipping. 1919 – via Internet Archive.
- Lloyd's Register of Shipping. Vol. II.–Steamers and Motorships. London: Lloyd's Register of Shipping. 1924 – via Internet Archive.
- Lloyd's Register of Shipping (PDF). Vol. II.–Steamers and Motorships of 300 tons gross & over. London: Lloyd's Register of Shipping. 1934 – via Southampton City Council.
- The Marconi Press Agency Ltd (1913). The Year Book of Wireless Telegraphy and Telephony. London: The St Katherine Press.
- The Marconi Press Agency Ltd (1914). The Year Book of Wireless Telegraphy and Telephony. London: The Marconi Press Agency Ltd.
- United States Department of Commerce (1920). Annual List of Merchant Vessels of the United States For the Year Ended June 30 1919. Washington, DC: Government Printing Office – via HathiTrust.
- Stadum, Lloyd M (June 1983). "Otsego, the other Prinz Eitel Friedrich". The Sea Chest. Vol. 16. Seattle: Puget Sound Maritime Historical Society. pp. 121–25.
- United States Department of War (1920). War Department Annual Reports, 1919. Vol. I (Part 4). Washington, DC: Government Printing Office – via HathiTrust.
- United States Government (1925). Hearings Before the Select Committee to Inquire into the Operations, Policies, and Affairs of the United States Shipping Board and the United States Emergency Fleet Corporation: Exhibits to Testimony Part F. Washington, DC: US Government – via United States National Library of Medicine.
