= SS Prinz Oskar =

German-built cargo liner

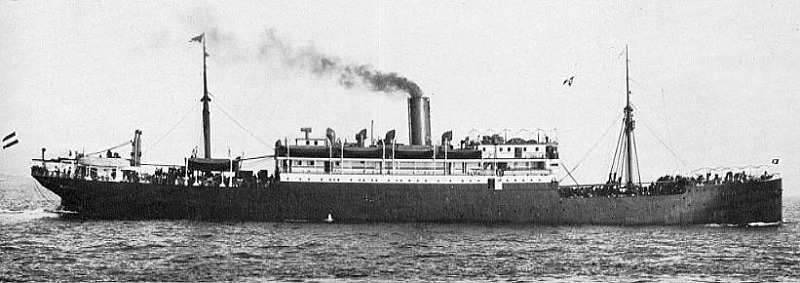
- Prinz Oskar

History
- Name: 1902: Prinz Oskar; 1919: Orion
- Namesake: 1902: Prince Oskar of Prussia; 1917: Orion
- Owner: 1903: Hamburg America Line; 1917: US Shipping Board
- Port of registry: 1903: (German Empire) Hamburg; 1919: (United States) New York
- Route: 1903: Genoa – Hoboken; 1906: Genoa – Buenos Aires; 1910: Hamburg – Hoboken; 1914: Hamburg – Philadelphia
- Builder: Bremer Vulkan, Vegesack
- Yard number: 451
- Launched: 15 December 1902
- Completed: 14 June 1903
- Maiden voyage: June 1903: Hamburg – Brazil
- Out of service: 1914–1917
- Identification: 1903: code letters RMVL; by 1913: call sign DDO; 1919: US official number 202863; 1919: code letters LMCW
- Fate: scrapped 1930

General characteristics
- Type: cargo liner
- Tonnage: 6,026 GRT, 3,777 NRT, 6,180 DWT
- Length: 403.4 ft (123.0 m)
- Beam: 49.2 ft (15.0 m)
- Depth: 27.1 ft (8.3 m)
- Decks: 3
- Installed power: 2 × quadruple-expansion engines; 402 NHP; 3,250 ihp
- Propulsion: 2 × screws
- Speed: 12 1/2 knots (23 km/h)
- Capacity: 125 × 1st class; 1,035 × steerage
- Crew: 121
- Sensors & processing systems: by 1910: submarine signalling
- Notes: sister ship: Prinz Adalbert

SS Prinz Oskar was a twin-screw cargo liner that was launched in Germany in 1902 for Hamburg America Line (HAPAG). She served various transatlantic routes between Europe and the Americas until the First World War began.

From 1914 she sheltered in Philadelphia to avoid capture by the Entente Powers. In 1917 the United States seized her, and by 1919 she had been renamed Orion. In 1922 Marcus Garvey's Black Star Line tried to buy her from the United States Shipping Board (USSB). She was scrapped in 1930.

== Prinz-class cargo liners ==
Between 1901 and 1903, HAPAG had seven new cargo liners built, each named after a prince of the House of Hohenzollern. Two were twin-screw ships, built by Bremer Vulkan Schiffbau & Machinenfabrik in Bremen-Vegesack. Prinz Adalbert was launched on 21 August 1902 and completed on 12 January 1903. Her sister ship Prinz Oskar was launched on 15 December 1902 and completed on 14 June 1903.

The other five formed a class of single-screw ships. Reiherstieg Schiffswerfte & Maschinenfabrik in Hamburg built Prinz Eitel Friedrich and Prinz Waldemar. AG "Neptun" in Rostock built Prinz Sigismund. Flensburger Schiffbau-Gesellschaft in Flensburg built Prinz August Wilhelm and Prinz Joachim.

Prinz Adalbert and Prinz Oskar were about 32 feet (10 m) longer and 4 feet (1.2 m) broader than the single-screw ships. The pair thus forms either a sub-class or a separate class.

== Description ==
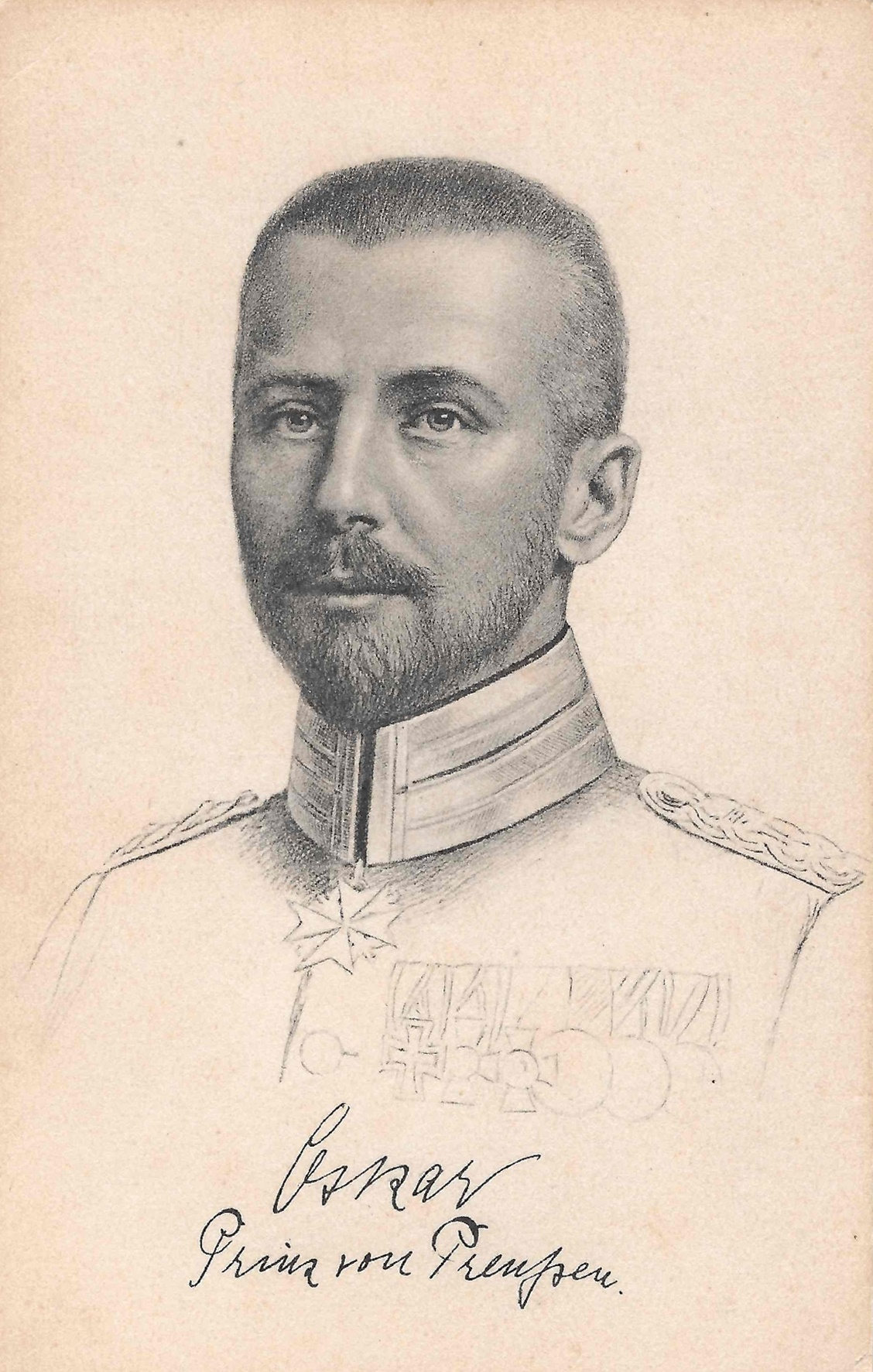
Prince Oskar of Prussia

Prinz Oskar was named after Prince Oskar of Prussia. Her registered length was 403.4 ft (123.0 m), her beam was 49.2 ft (15.0 m), and her depth was 27.1 ft (8.3 m). Her tonnages were 6,026 GRT, 3,777 NRT, and 6,180 DWT. As built, she had berths for 1,160 passengers: 125 in first class, and 1,035 in steerage.

Prinz Oskar had a pair of quadruple-expansion engines to drive her twin screws. Their combined power was rated at 402 NHP or 3,250 ihp, and they gave her a speed of 12 1/2 knots (23 km/h).

== HAPAG career ==
HAPAG registered Prinz Oskar at Hamburg. Her code letters were RMVL. In June 1903 she began her maiden voyage, which was from Hamburg to Brazil.

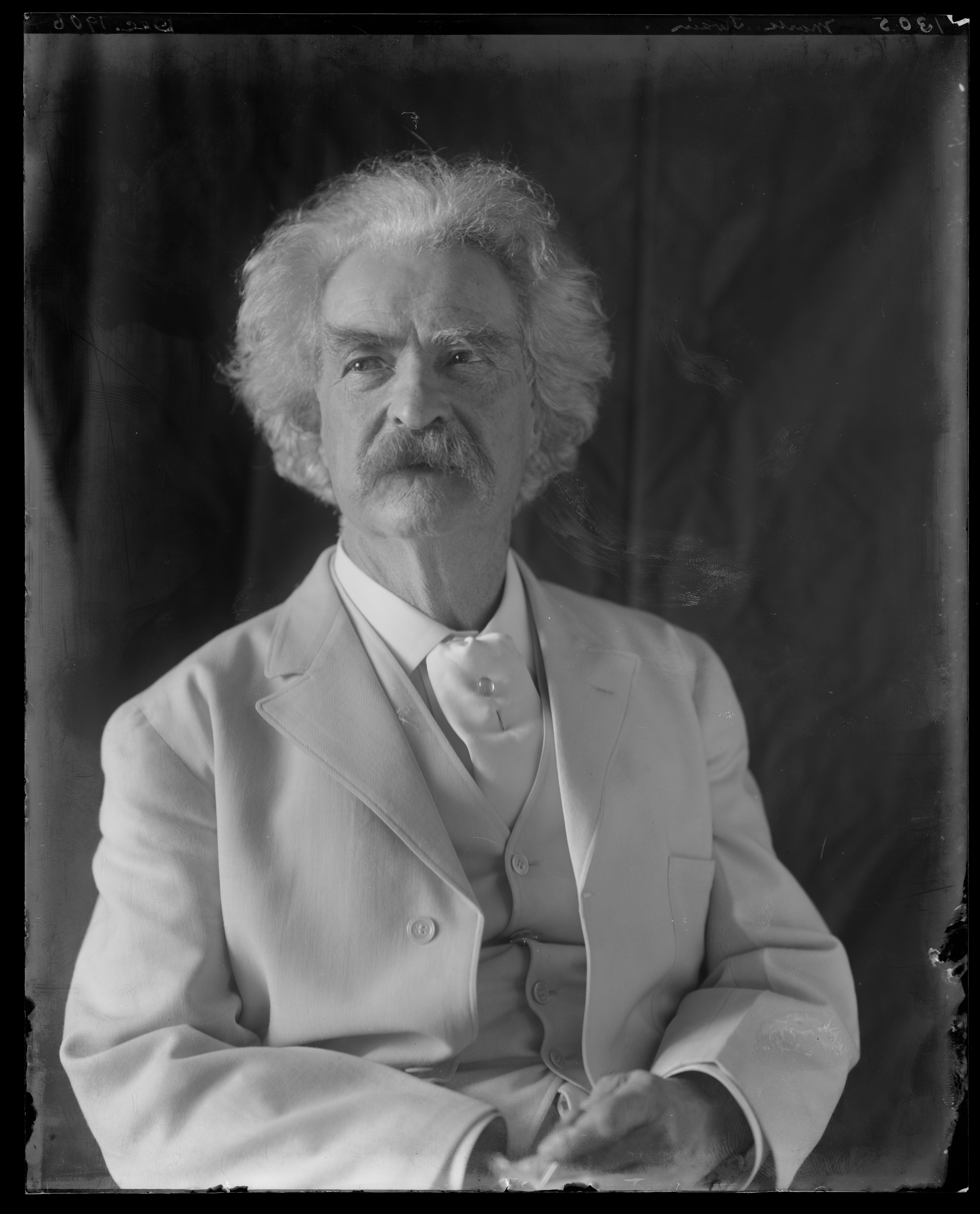
Mark Twain

From 10 October 1903 Prinz Oskar's route was between Genoa in Italy and New York via Naples. By 1905 it included a call at Palermo in Sicily on westbound voyages only. On 5 June 1904 Olivia Langdon Clemens, wife of author Mark Twain, died in Italy. On 28 June Twain embarked on Prinz Oskar at Naples to bring her body home to New York.

In August 1904 HAPAG announced that from 1 October its steerage fares from New York would be $15 to Naples and Genoa, and $16 to Trieste in Italy and Fiume in Austria-Hungary (now Rijeka in Croatia). On 6 September 1904 Prinz Oskar left New York on a crossing to Italy. When she reached Naples on 22 September a passenger, Romulo Alcivar, shot her Master, Captain Dugge, and another passenger, Frank Shattuck. Both victims survived, but Dugge was wounded in the mouth, and Shattuck had a bullet in his left shoulder. Alcivar was overpowered and taken to a Lunatic asylum. Prinz Oskar's Chief Officer took command, and the ship's doctor, and a doctor from among the passengers, treated Captain Dugge. Shattuck continued his voyage to Naples.

On a westbound crossing in January 1906 a storm in the North Atlantic loosened some of the rivets on the port side of Prinz Oskar's hull, causing a leak in one of her holds. The leak was about 5 feet (1.5 m) above the waterline, abreast of the forward part of her superstructure. Seawater damaged hundreds of boxes of macaroni and several thousand lemons in her cargo, and her pumps were run continually to minimise the water in the damaged hold. The storm also damaged her steam-powered steering engine. Her crew used her manual steering gear until her engine department completed the steering engine's repair. She reached New York on 11 January, four days late.

Prinz Oskar carried migrants to the USA. On one crossing in March 1906 she landed 1,102 people at Ellis Island. On 16 April on her next crossing she landed 1,105 people.

On 22 September 1906 Prinz Oskar inaugurated a new HAPAG route to the ports of the Río de la Plata. In January 1908 HAPAG announced that from that May, Prinz Adalbert and Prinz Oskar would serve a route to Brazil.

By September 1910 Prinz Oskar's route was between Hamburg and New York. Also by 1910, Prinz Oskar was equipped with submarine signalling and wireless telegraphy. By July 1911 she was sailing to Philadelphia, reportedly from Bremen. By 1913 Prinz Oskar's wireless call sign was DDO. By 1914 Prinz Adalbert and Prinz Oskar served a North Atlantic route between Hamburg and Philadelphia, sometimes with an intermediate call at Emden.

=== Collision with City of Georgetown ===
On the night of 1–2 February 1913 Prinz Oskar left Philadelphia carrying 30 passengers in steerage and three in first class. About half-past midnight she was emerging from the Delaware Breakwater when her watch sighted the four-masted cargo schooner City of Georgetown near the Five Fathom Bank lightship. The liner put her engines full astern and both ships changed course, but three minutes later the wooden schooner struck her port bow. The schooner lost all four of her masts and began to settle by her bow. City of Georgetown's Master and crew launched a dory and abandoned ship, with four men in the boat, and the other four in the water clinging to the boat. The schooner sank within minutes.

Prinz Oskar lowered a lifeboat, with which City of Georgetown's crew was rescued. Prinz Oskar developed a list from water entering the hole in her bow. She turned back and anchored off Gloucester City, New Jersey to await a berth to disambark her passengers and unload her cargo, before being repaired.

=== Laid up in Philadelphia ===
On 22 July 1914 Prinz Oskar left Hamburg with 360 passengers for Philadelphia. On 31 July HAPAG announced the suspension of all its services. On 3 August 1914 Germany declared war on Belgium and France, and the next day the United Kingdom declared war on Germany. Prinz Oskar blacked out all lights except her navigation lights, and continued at full speed. On 5 August she reached Philadelphia.

On 7 May 1915 a German U-boat sank RMS Lusitania. 1,199 people were killed, including 128 US citizens. The USA considered going to war with the Central Powers, in which case it would seize their ships in ports that it controlled, including Prinz Oskar in Philadelphia.

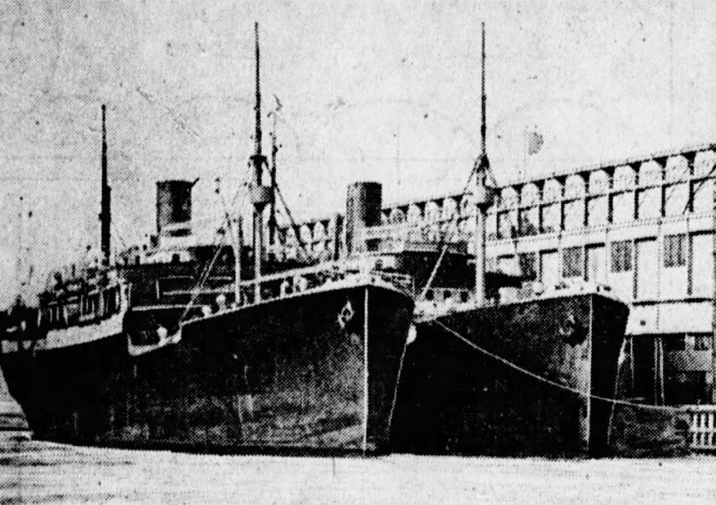
Rhaetia and Prinz Oskar in Philadelphia

In March 1916 it was denied that American International Corporation, via W. R. Grace and Company, was negotiating to buy Prinz Oskar and Rhaetia from HAPAG for the Pacific Mail Steamship Company, which the two companies jointly owned. Rhaetia was in Philadelphia with Prinz Oskar.

On 1 February 1917 Germany resumed unrestricted submarine warfare against the Entente Powers. On 4 February the US government ordered that the crews of Central Powers ships in US-controlled ports be confined to their ships. The Collector of the Port of Philadelphia increased the number of US Customs men guarding Prinz Oskar, Rhaetia and the Austro-Hungarian cargo ship Franconia.

== US career ==
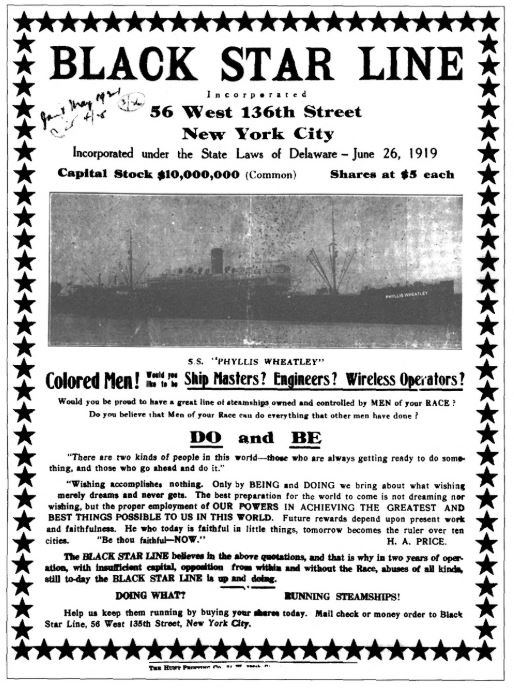
Black Star Line brochure, featuring a doctored photo of Orion

On 6 April 1917 the USA declared war on Germany, and seized German ships in US ports. On 11 June the USSB announced that it would time trip charter Prinz Oskar, Rhaetia, and the Deutsch-Australische DG ship Magdeburg to the Italian government. On 30 June President Woodrow Wilson issued an executive order authorising the USSB to take possession and title of 87 German ships, including Prinz Oskar.

By 1919 Prinz Oskar had been renamed Orion. Her US official number was 202863 and her code letters were LMCW. She was one of 103 German ships that the USSB put up for sale on 25 December 1919.

By 1922 Orion was registered in the name of Marcus Garvey's Black Star Line (BSL). Garvey intended to rename her Phillis Wheatley, after the author Phillis Wheatley. But BSL went bankrupt that February, the ship's name remained Orion, and her ownership remained with the USSB. She was scrapped in Baltimore in 1930.

== Bibliography ==
- Haws, Duncan (1980). The Ships of the Hamburg America, Adler and Carr Lines. Merchant Fleets in Profile. Vol. 4. Cambridge: Patrick Stephens Ltd. ISBN 0-85059-397-2.
- Lloyd's Register of British and Foreign Shipping. Vol. I.–Steamers. London: Lloyd's Register of Shipping. 1905 – via Internet Archive.
- Lloyd's Register of British and Foreign Shipping. Vol. I.–Steamers. London: Lloyd's Register of Shipping. 1910 – via Internet Archive.
- Lloyd's Register of Shipping. Vol. II.–Steamers. London: Lloyd's Register of Shipping. 1919 – via Internet Archive.
- Lloyd's Register of Shipping. Vol. II.–Steamers and Motor Vessels. London: Lloyd's Register of Shipping. 1922 – via Internet Archive.
- Lloyd's Register of Shipping. Vol. II.–Steamers and Motor Vessels. London: Lloyd's Register of Shipping. 1923 – via Internet Archive.
- The Marconi Press Agency Ltd (1913). The Year Book of Wireless Telegraphy and Telephony. London: The St Katherine Press.
- The Marconi Press Agency Ltd (1914). The Year Book of Wireless Telegraphy and Telephony. London: The Marconi Press Agency Ltd.
- Rothe, Klaus (1986). Deutsche Ozean-Passagierschiffe 1896 bis 1918. Bibliothek der Schiffstypen (in German). Berlin: VEB Verlag für Verkehrswesen. ISBN 3-344-00059-4.
