= Otsego Township =

Otsego Township may refer to the following places in the United States:

- Otsego Township, Steuben County, Indiana
- Otsego Township, Michigan

== See also ==
- Otsego (disambiguation)
- Otsego Lake Township, Michigan
