= USS General W. C. Gorgas =

German-built cargo liner

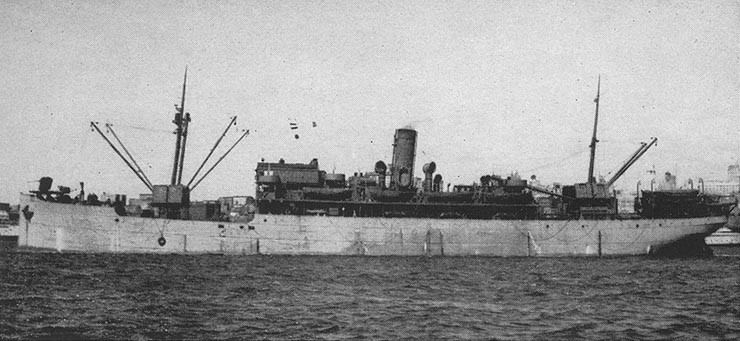
- The ship as USAT General W. C. Gorgas

History
- Name: 1902: Prinz Sigismund; 1917: General W. C. Gorgas; 1945: Mikhail Lomonosov
- Namesake: 1902: Prince Sigismund of Prussia; 1917: William C. Gorgas; 1945: Mikhail Lomonosov
- Owner: 1903: Hamburg America Line; 1917: US Shipping Board; 1920: Panama Canal Railway; 1926: Libby, McNeill & Libby; 1945: Soviet Union
- Operator: 1917: Panama Canal Railway; 1919: United States Navy; 1941: United States Army
- Port of registry: 1903: (German Empire) Hamburg; 1917: (United States) New York; 1926: (United States) San Francisco; 1945: (Soviet Union)
- Route: 1903: Hamburg – Brazil
- Builder: AG "Neptun", Rostock
- Yard number: 207
- Launched: 28 September 1902
- Completed: 6 July 1903
- Commissioned: into US Navy, 8 March 1919
- Decommissioned: from US Navy, 28 July 1919
- Maiden voyage: July 1903
- Refit: 1919
- Identification: 1903: code letters RMVQ; 1913: call sign DSG; 1919: Naval Registry ID-1365; 1919: naval code letters GJDS; 1919: US official number 215110; 1919: civilian code letters LHDV; 1934: call sign WQCZ
- Fate: scrapped 1958

General characteristics
- Class & type: Prinz-class cargo liner
- Tonnage: 4,689 GRT, 2,942 NRT
- Displacement: 8,000 tons
- Length: 386 ft (118 m) overall; 370.2 ft (112.8 m) registered
- Beam: 45.3 ft (13.8 m)
- Draft: 24 ft 4 3/4 in (7.436 m)
- Depth: 26.8 ft (8.2 m)
- Decks: 2
- Installed power: 318 NHP
- Propulsion: 1 × quadruple-expansion engine; 1 × screw
- Speed: 12 knots (22 km/h)
- Capacity: 736 passengers
- Troops: 1,200
- Complement: 154

USS General W. C. Gorgas (ID-1365) was a cargo liner that was launched in Germany in 1902 as Prinz Sigismund for the Hamburg America Line. In 1917 the USA seized her and renamed her General W. C. Gorgas. In 1945 she was transferred to the Soviet Union, which renamed her Mikhail Lomonosov. She was scrapped in March 1958.

The Panama Railway Company operated the ship from 1917, and owned her by 1920. In 1919 she spent a few months in the United States Navy, repatriating troops from France to the USA. In 1926 Libby, McNeill & Libby bought her for use in the Pacific. She was a United States Army troopship from 1941 until 1945, when she was transferred to the USSR.

== Prinz-class ocean liners ==
Between 1901 and 1903 HAPAG had seven new cargo liners built, each named after a prince of the House of Hohenzollern. Five of them were single-screw ships. Reiherstieg Schiffswerfte & Maschinenfabrik in Hamburg built Prinz Eitel Friedrich and Prinz Waldemar. Flensburger Schiffbau-Gesellschaft in Flensburg built Prinz August Wilhelm and Prinz Joachim. Prinz Sigismund was unique, being the only member of the class built by AG "Neptun" in Rostock.

At the same time, Bremer Vulkan Schiffbau & Machinenfabrik in Bremen-Vegesack built Prinz Adalbert and Prinz Oskar. These were about 32 feet (10 m) longer and 4 feet (1.2 m) broader than the other five, and were twin-screw ships. They thus form either a sub-class or a separate class.

== Building ==
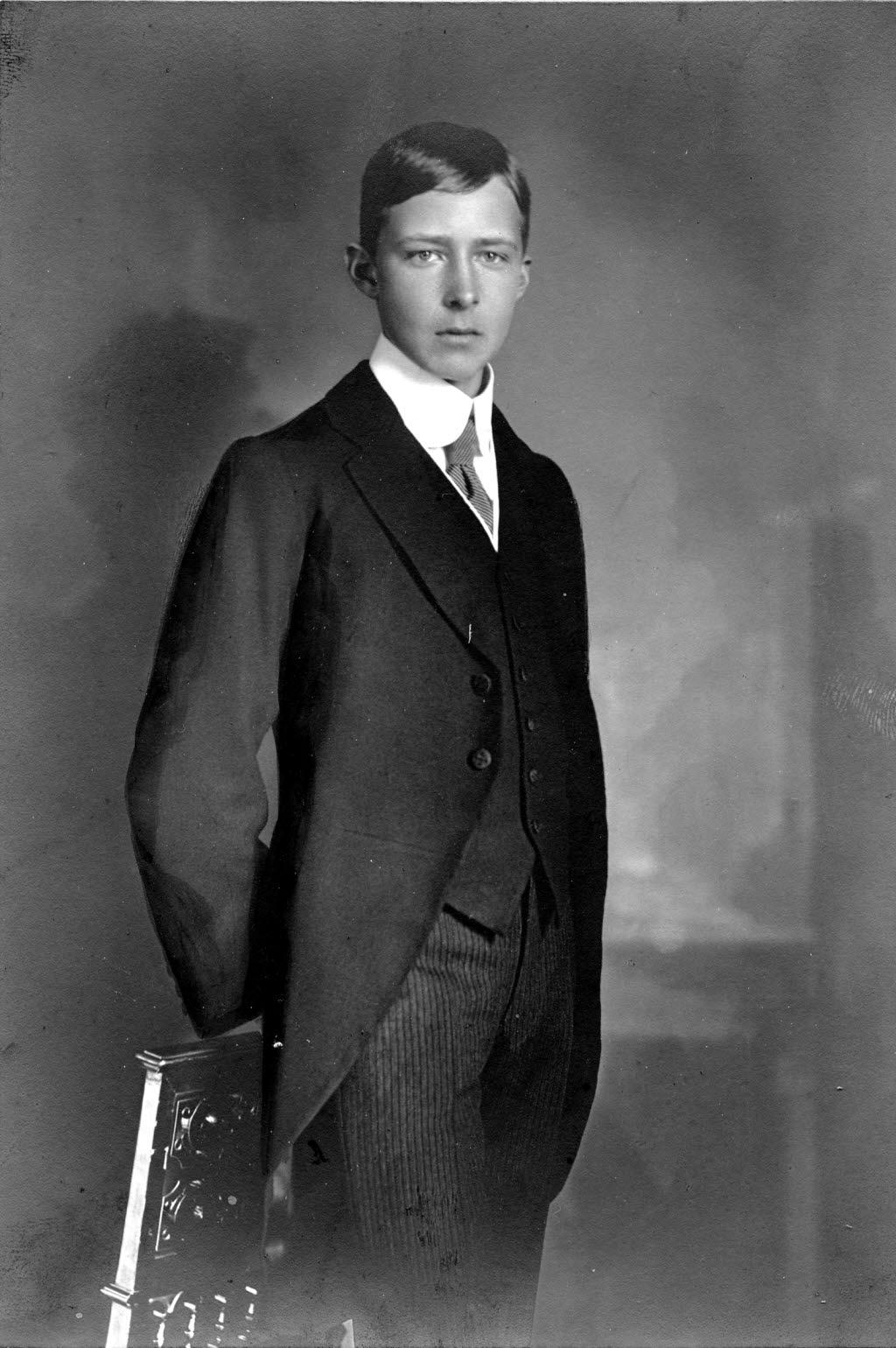
Prince Sigismund of Prussia

Prinz Sigismund was named after Prince Sigismund of Prussia. "Neptun" built her as yard number 207, and launched her on 28 September 1902. In February 1903 she was damaged by fire, which delayed her completion until 6 July 1903. Her lengths were 386 ft (118 m) overall and 370.2 ft (112.8 m) registered. Her beam was 45.3 ft (13.8 m), her depth was 26.8 ft (8.2 m), and her draft was 24 ft 5 3/4 in (7.461 m). Her tonnages were 4,689 GRT, 2,942 NRT, and 8,000 tons displacement. As built, she had capacity for 736 passengers.

Her single screw was driven by a quadruple-expansion engine that was rated at 318 NHP and gave her a speed of 12 knots (22 km/h).

== HAPAG career ==
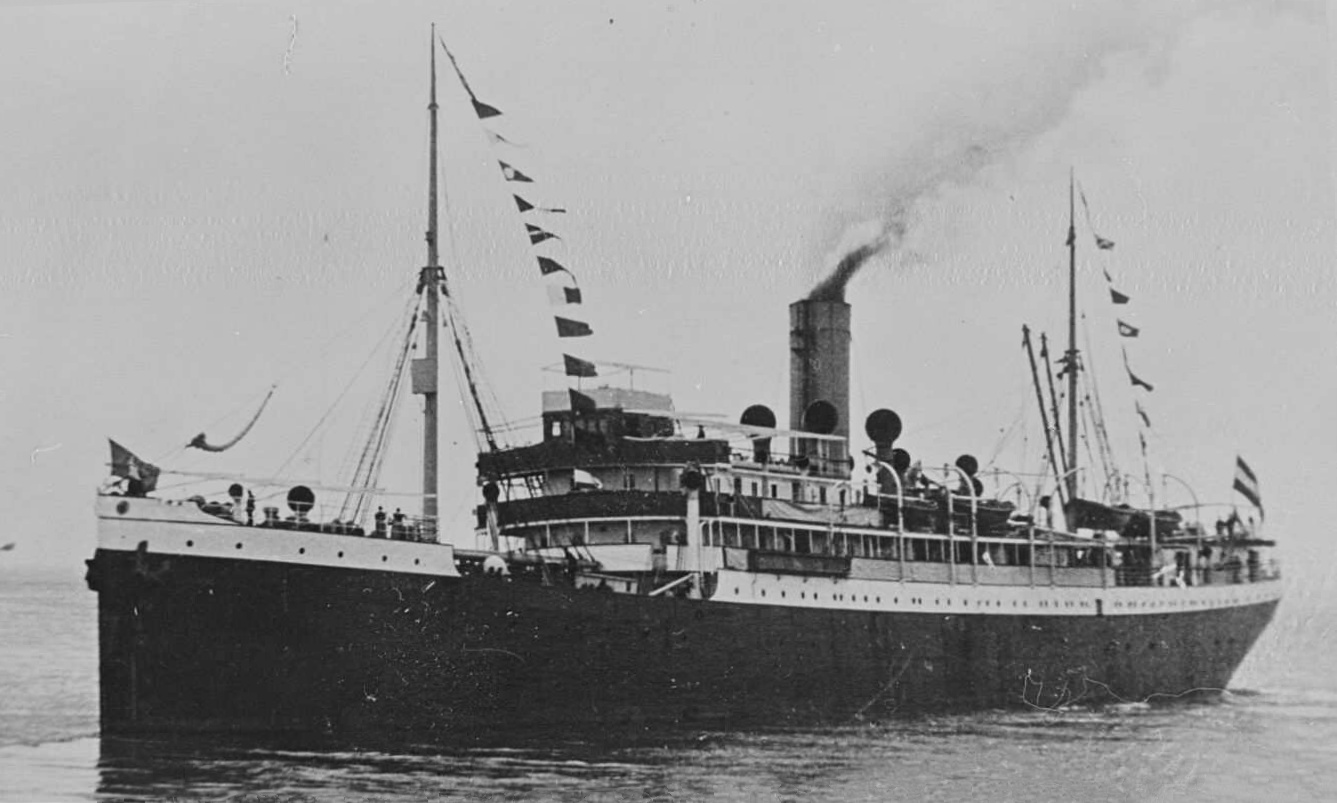
Prinz Sigismund

HAPAG registered Prinz Sigismund at Hamburg. Her code letters were RMVQ. By 1910 she was equipped with wireless telegraphy. By 1913 her call sign was DSG. Her maiden voyage was from Hamburg to Brazil.

In 1901 HAPAG had taken over the Atlas Line, and re-branded it the "Atlas Service". It ran round-trip voyages from Port of New York and New Jersey to the Caribbean. By January 1908 Prinz Sigismund was on the Atlas service.

For the season from September 1912 to January 1913 HAPAG advertised Prinz Sigismund and her sister ship Prinz Eitel Friedrich making round trips from New York to Fortune Island (now Long Cay), Montego Bay, Kingston, Colón, and Puerto Limón. In 1913 Prinz Sigismund also made Caribbean trips in the summer. In December 1913 Prinz Sigismund went to Haiti.

When the First World War began in August 1914, Germany ordered its merchant ships to take refuge in the nearest neutral port. Prinz Sigismund stayed in Colón in Panama. On 3 February 1917 the US government seized German and Austro-Hungarian ships, both in US ports, and in ports overseas that it controlled. US authorities in Colón seized Prinz Sigismund and three other HAPAG ships.

== Panama Railway and the US Navy ==
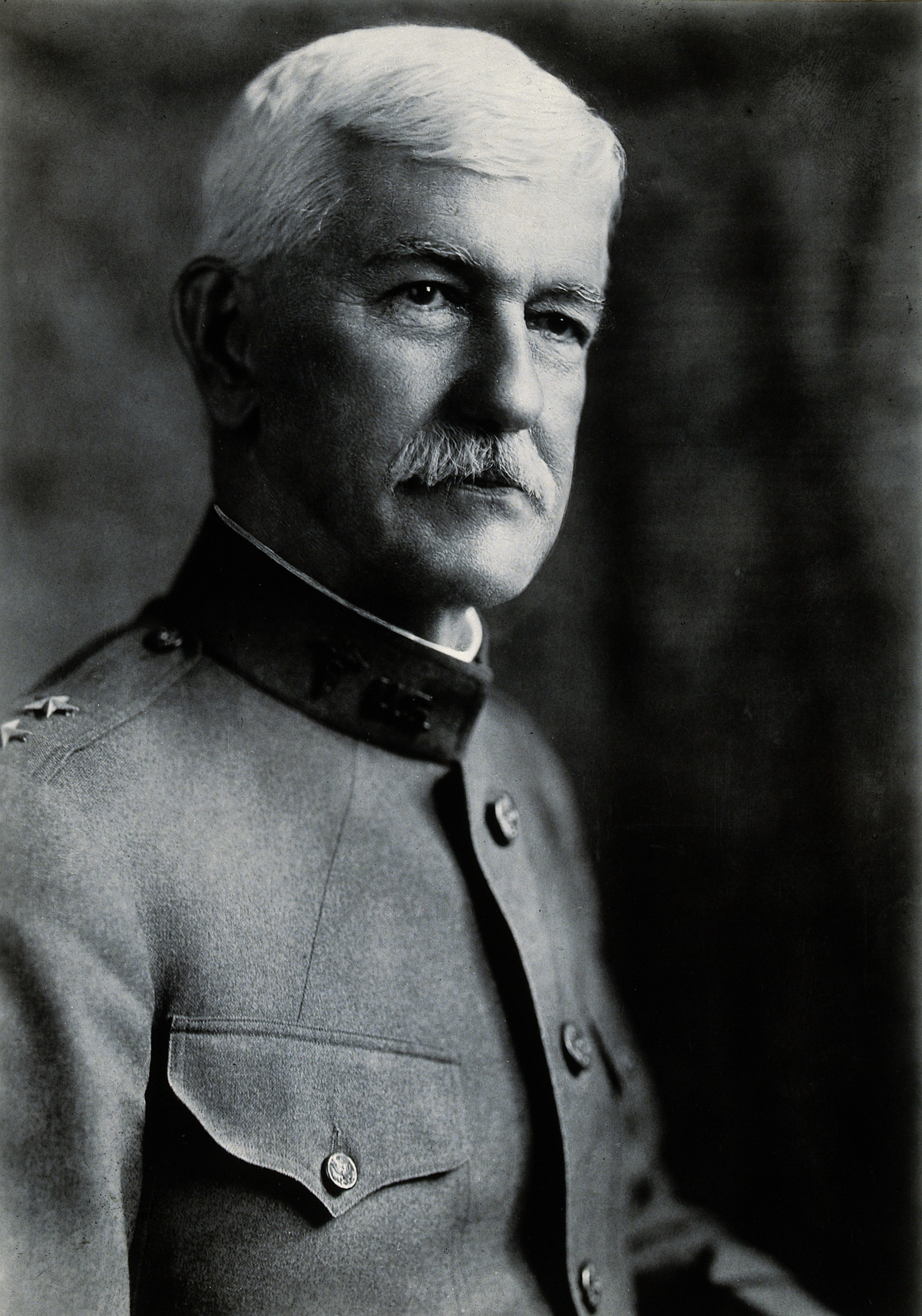
General William C. Gorgas

On 6 April 1917 the USA declared war on Germany. The United States Shipping Board (USSB) assumed ownership of Prinz Sigismund and appointed the Panama Canal Railway to manage her. She was renamed after William C. Gorgas, the United States Army Medical Corps General who directed the sanitation measures to control mosquitoes, and mosquito-borne diseases, to enable the building of the Panama Canal. She was registered in New York. Her US official number was 215110 and her code letters were LHDV. Under Panama Railway management she took US troops and cargo to Europe.

In 1919 General W. C. Gorgas was converted into a troopship to repatriate US troops from Europe. On 8 March she was commissioned into the US Navy, with the Naval Registry Identification Number ID-1365 and call sign GJDS. She was assigned to the Cruiser and Transport Force. On 25 April 1919 she left New York for Bordeaux, France, where she loaded cargo and embarked US troops. She reached Philadelphia on 2 June 1919. On 5 June she left Philadelphia on her second voyage to Bordeaux. This time she brought troops to Newport News, Virginia, where she arrived on 4 July. In her two Navy voyages she repatriated a total of 2,063 troops. On 28 July she was decommissioned from the Navy and returned to the USSB.

== Libby's and the US Army ==
By 1920 the Panama Railway had bought General W. C. Gorgas from the USSB. In 1926 Libby, McNeill & Libby bought her and registered her in San Francisco. Libby already owned one of her sister ships, formerly Prinz Eitel Friedrich, now renamed Otsego. By 1934 her call sign was WQCZ, and this had superseded her code letters.

In November 1941, before the Attack on Pearl Harbor, the United States Department of War chartered General W. C. Gorgas and had her converted into a US Army troopship. She carried troops and supplies between Seattle and Alaska until January 1945, when she was returned to the War Shipping Administration at Seattle.

== Soviet career ==
In 1945 the ship was transferred to the USSR, who renamed her after the 18th-century polymath Mikhail Lomonosov. She was scrapped in the USSR in March 1958.

== Bibliography ==
- Haws, Duncan (1980). The Ships of the Hamburg America, Adler and Carr Lines. Merchant Fleets in Profile. Vol. 4. Cambridge: Patrick Stephens Ltd. ISBN 0-85059-397-2.
- Lloyd's Register of British and Foreign Shipping. Vol. I.–Steamers. London: Lloyd's Register of Shipping. 1904 – via Internet Archive.
- Lloyd's Register of British and Foreign Shipping. Vol. I.–Steamers. London: Lloyd's Register of Shipping. 1910 – via Internet Archive.
- Lloyd's Register of Shipping. Vol. II.–Steamers. London: Lloyd's Register of Shipping. 1919 – via Internet Archive.
- Lloyd's Register of Shipping. Vol. II.–Steamers. London: Lloyd's Register of Shipping. 1920 – via Internet Archive.
- Lloyd's Register of Shipping. Vol. II.–Steamers and Motorships. London: Lloyd's Register of Shipping. 1926 – via Internet Archive.
- Lloyd's Register of Shipping (PDF). Vol. II.–Steamers and Motorships of 300 tons gross & over. London: Lloyd's Register of Shipping. 1934 – via Southampton City Council.
- The Marconi Press Agency Ltd (1913). The Year Book of Wireless Telegraphy and Telephony. London: The St Katherine Press.
- Rothe, Klaus (1986). Deutsche Ozean-Passagierschiffe 1896 bis 1918. Bibliothek der Schiffstypen (in German). Berlin: VEB Verlag für Verkehrswesen. ISBN 3-344-00059-4.
