= Cassen (disambiguation) =

Cassen is a commune in the Landes department in Nouvelle-Aquitaine in southwestern France.

Cassen may also refer to:

- Bernard Cassen (1937–2025), French journalist
- Robert Cassen (born 1935), British economist

== See also ==
- Cassens, a surname
