= Port of Emden =

Seaport in Lower Saxony, Germany

Coordinates: 53°20′40″N 7°11′48″E

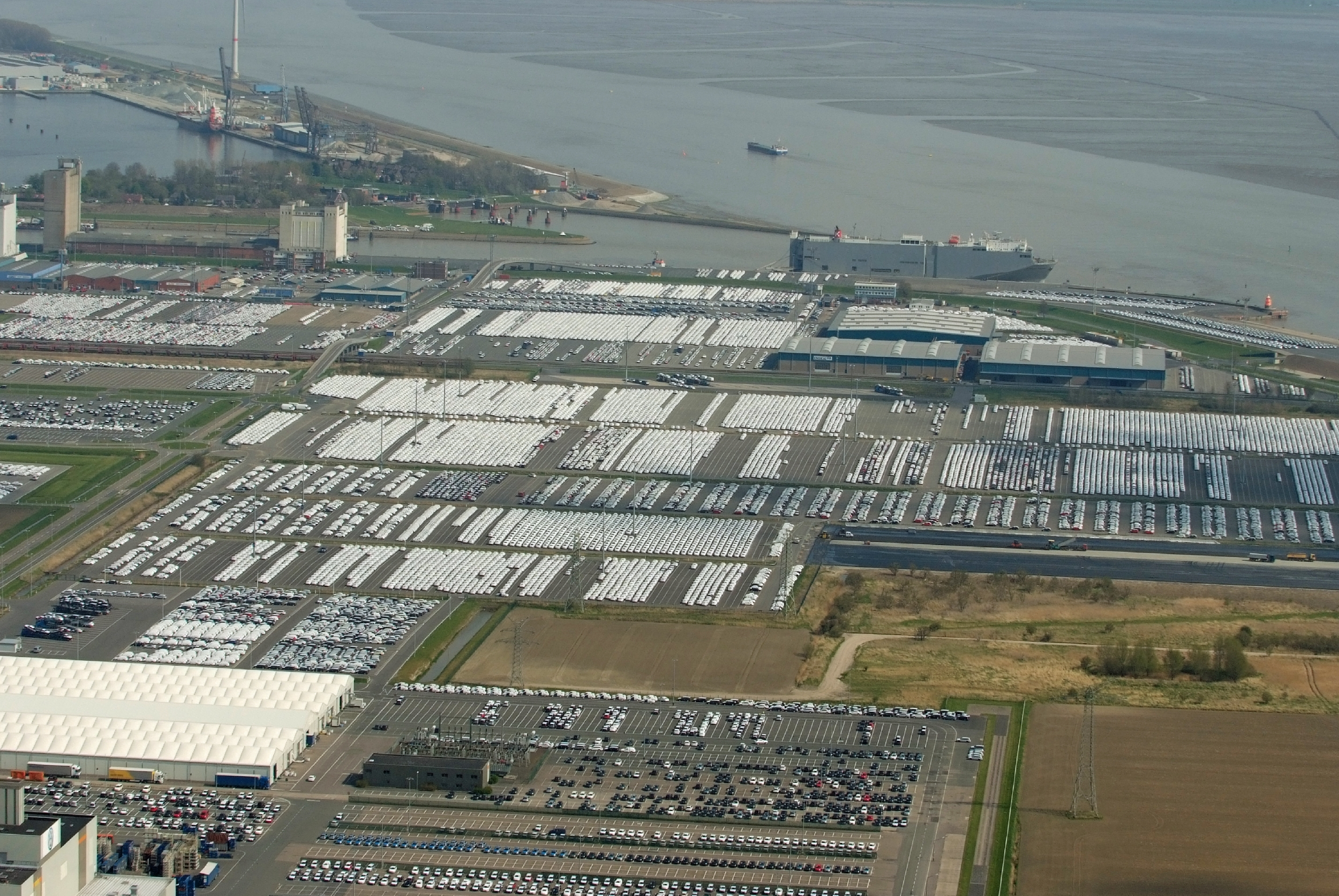
Volkswagen at Emden harbor, River Ems in the background

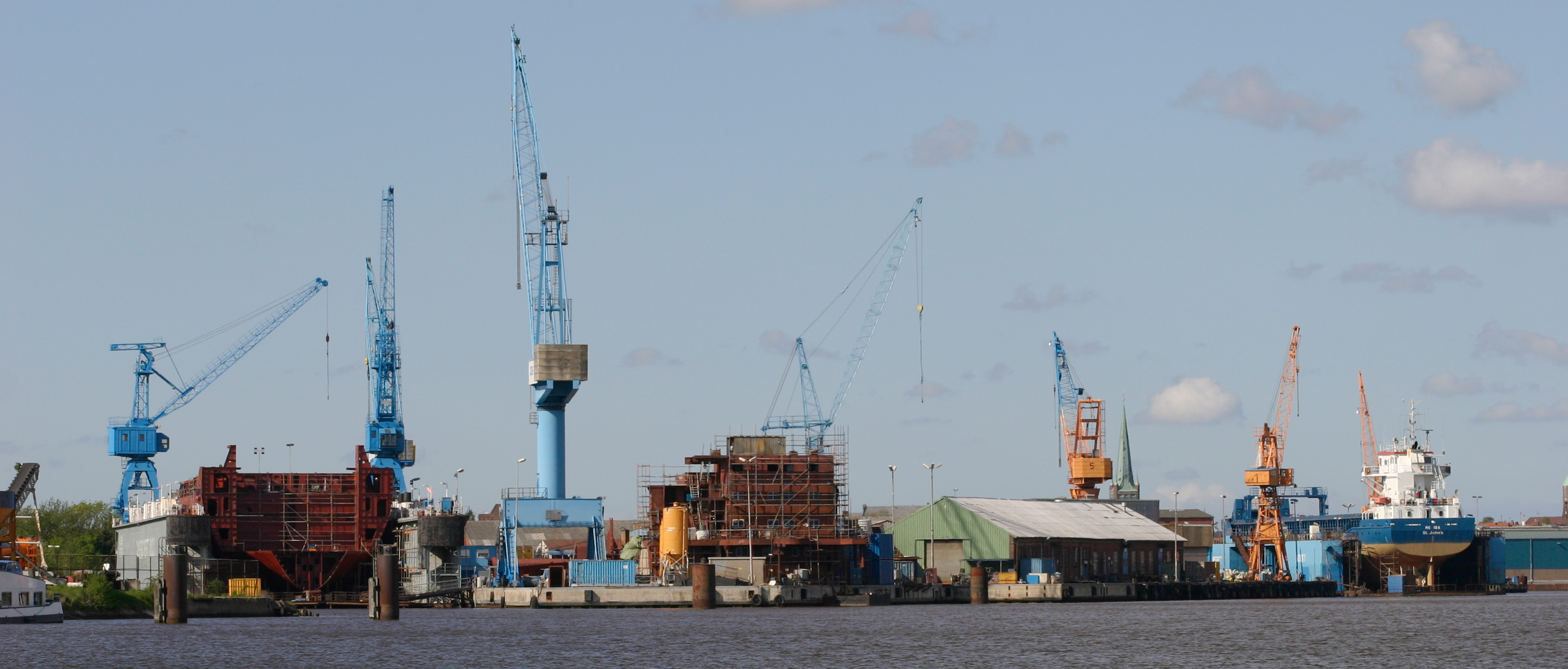
Cassens shipbuilding company

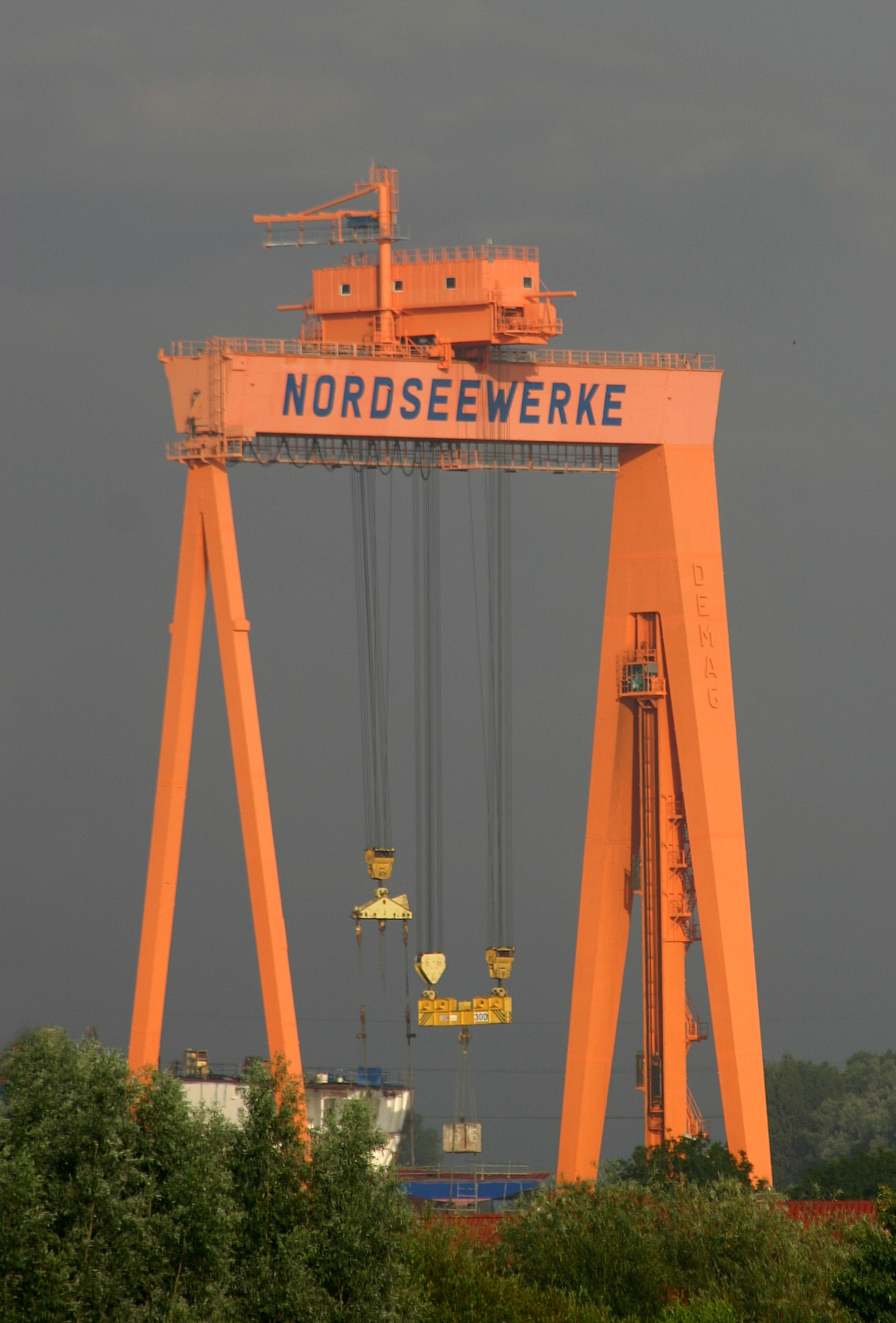
Gantry crane of Nordseewerke

The Port of Emden is the seaport of the German city of Emden at the mouth of the Ems to the North Sea. It is the westernmost seaport on the coast of Germany; in 2011, it reached an annual turnover of about 6.29 million tons. Major transhipment products include motor vehicles, forest products and, increasingly, wind turbines. In motor vehicles, the Emden port is the third largest in Europe after Zeebrugge and Bremerhaven (2017: 1.92 million vehicles, 2015: 1.406.807 vehicles).

The sea freight turnover in 2017 was 5.08 million tons) (2016: 4.33 million tons, 2015: 4.29 million tons). These figures included components for the wind energy sector.

The operator of the Port of Emden is Niedersachsen Ports.

In addition, Emden is an important ferry port to the North Sea island Borkum. The port is connected to the railway network with the Emden Außenhafen station via Emden main station.

Large industry and shipbuilding companies are located at Emden harbor, among them Volkswagen, Nordseewerke, ThyssenKrupp Marine Systems, Cassens and many others.
