= Cassens =

Cassens is a surname. Notable people with the surname include:

- Dale Cassens (1935–1987), American politician
- Monika Cassens (born 1953), German former badminton player

== See also ==
- Cassels
- Cassen (disambiguation)
