= Otsego Lake =

Otsego Lake may refer to:

Bodies of water:

- Otsego Lake (Michigan)
- Otsego Lake (New York)

Other:

- Otsego Lake Township, Michigan
  - Otsego Lake, Michigan, an unincorporated community
- Otsego Lake State Park, Michigan
