= Otego =

Otego may refer to:

Places in the United States:

- Otego Township, Fayette County, Illinois
- Otego (village), New York in Otsego County
- Otego (town), New York in Otsego County
- Otego, Kansas

== See also ==
- Otego Creek
- List of The Dark Tower characters#Finli O'Tego
- Otago
- Otago Peninsula
