= Reiherstieg Schiffswerfte & Maschinenfabrik =

Former shipyard in Hamburg

- Industry: Shipbuilding
- Founded: 1706
- Defunct: around 1918
- Fate: ?
- Successor: Deutsche Werft
- Headquarters: Hamburg, Germany
- Products: Passenger ships Cargo ships Tankers; U-boats

Reiherstieg Schiffswerfte & Maschinenfabrik, also known as Reiherstiegwerft, was a German shipbuilding company, located on the Reiherstieg River in Hamburg. It was founded in 1706 by Lucas Kramer.

In the 1880s, Reiherstieg built SMS Marie, the first warship built in Hamburg for the German Navy.

During World War I Reiherstiegwerft built three U 151 U-boats for the Kaiserliche Marine, the U-151, U-152 and U-153.
