= SS Vaterland (1940) =

Transatlantic ocean liner

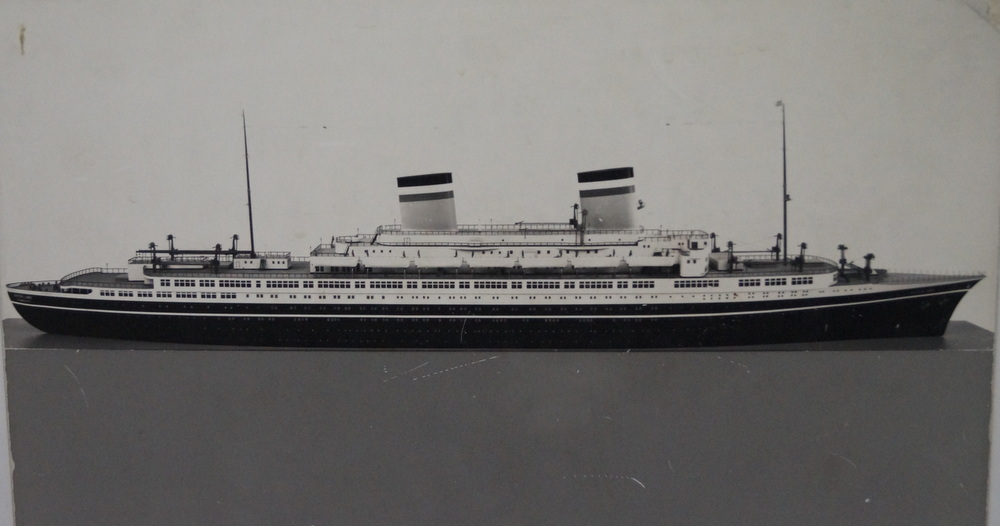
- Model of how the completed Vaterland would have looked

History

Germany
- Name: Vaterland
- Namesake: German for "Fatherland"
- Owner: (planned) HAPAG
- Operator: (planned, 1940) Hamburg America Line; (planned, 1941) Deutsche Amerika Linie
- Port of registry: (planned) Hamburg
- Route: (planned) Hamburg – Hoboken
- Builder: Blohm+Voss, Hamburg
- Laid down: 1938
- Launched: 1940
- Fate: damaged by air raid 1943, scrapped 1948

General characteristics
- Type: Ocean liner
- Tonnage: 36,000 GRT or 41,000 GRT
- Length: 251.16 m (824 ft 0 in)
- Beam: 30.00 m (98 ft 5 in)
- Depth: 12.78 m (41 ft 11 in)
- Decks: 5
- Installed power: 62,000 shp
- Propulsion: steam turbines, turbo-electric transmission, 2 × screws
- Speed: (planned) 24 knots (44 km/h)
- Capacity: Passengers (planned): 354 × 1st class; 435 × tourist class; 533 × 3rd class

SS Vaterland was a transatlantic ocean liner that was launched for the Hamburg America Line in 1940 but left incomplete because of the Second World War. An Allied air raid damaged her in 1943, and she was scrapped in 1948.

She was the second Vaterland to be built for HAPAG. The first was launched in 1913, seized by the United States in 1917, renamed Leviathan, and used as a US troop ship and ocean liner.

== Background ==
After the Treaty of Versailles was signed in June 1919, the Allies seized many German merchant ships as part of World War I reparations. HAPAG lost almost its entire fleet, including its three large Imperator-class ocean liners Imperator, Vaterland and the uncompleted Bismarck. In the 1920s HAPAG re-established a fleet of transatlantic liners of intermediate size and speed, but no very large or very fast ships.

HAPAG's rival Norddeutscher Lloyd introduced the large and fast Bremen in 1929 and her sister Europa in 1930, each of which won the Blue Riband. The Italian Rex introduced in 1932, French Normandie introduced in 1935 and British RMS Queen Mary introduced in 1936 were all also large transatlantic liners that won the Blue Riband during the 1930s.

HAPAG responded by planning a set of three new liners for its Hamburg – Hoboken route. They would be smaller than their British, French, German and Italian competitors, but they would be the largest ships in the HAPAG fleet, and they would be fast enough for three ships to maintain weekly departures in both directions.

== Building and loss ==
Blohm+Voss in Hamburg, who had launched the first Vaterland in 1913, laid down the new Vaterland in 1938 and launched her in 1940. Her length was 251.16 m (824 ft 0 in), her beam was 30.00 m (98 ft 5 in) and her depth was 12.78 m (41 ft 11 in). Work on her was stopped because of the war. The uncompleted ship was laid up in the Kuhwerder area of Hamburg.

Vaterland was to have berths for 1,313 passengers: 354 first class, 435 tourist class and 533 third class. Her projected tonnage could have been 36,000 GRT or 41,000 GRT. She was to have turbo-electric transmission, with steam turbines driving alternators to power electric motors. They would have developed 62,000 shaft horsepower and given her a speed of 24 knots (44 km/h).

In 1941 the German government formed a new Deutsche Amerika Linie, based in Bremen, to consolidate HAPAG and NDL's North Atlantic services. When completed, Vaterland was to be part of this new united fleet.

In July 1943, RAF Bomber Command and the USAAF Eighth Air Force bombed Hamburg for several days to destroy the city. On 25 July Vaterland was badly damaged, with her foredeck torn back so far that it covered her bridge. She lay unrepaired until 1948, when she was scrapped.

== Bibliography ==
- Haws, Duncan (1980). The Ships of the Hamburg America, Adler and Carr Lines. Merchant Fleets in Profile. Vol. 4. Cambridge: Patrick Stephens Ltd. ISBN 0-85059-397-2.
