= RMS Majestic (1914) =

Ocean liner from 1922 to 1939

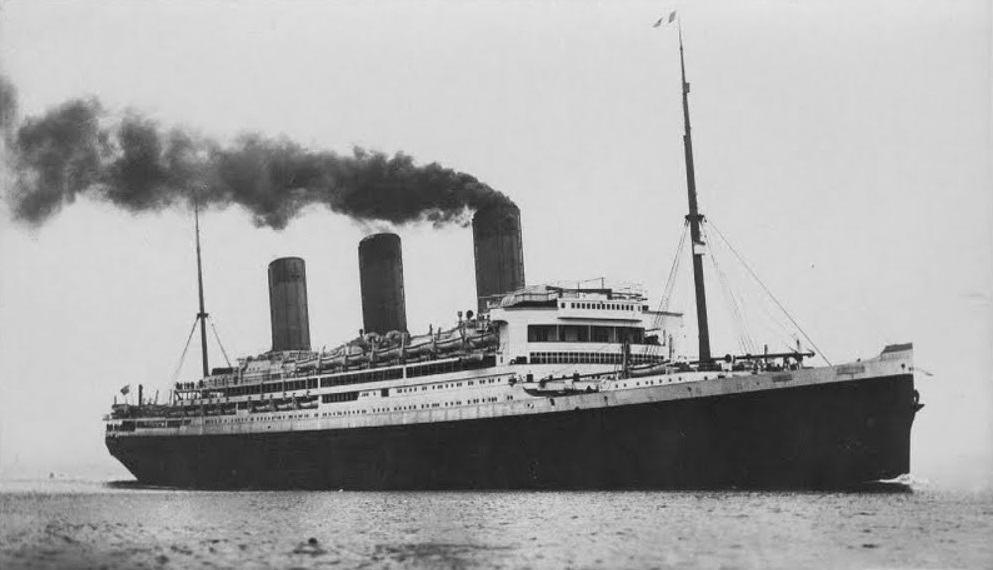
- RMS Majestic, c. 1922

History

Germany
- Name: SS Bismarck
- Namesake: Otto von Bismarck
- Owner: Hamburg America Line
- Builder: Blohm & Voss
- Laid down: 1913
- Launched: 20 June 1914
- Fate: Awarded to the White Star Line in 1920 as a war prize for the sinking of HMHS Britannic

United Kingdom
- Name: RMS Majestic
- Owner: 1922–1934: White Star Line; 1934–1936: Cunard-White Star Line; 1936-1939: Royal Navy
- Operator: 1922–1934: White Star Line; 1934–1936: Cunard-White Star Line
- Port of registry: Liverpool (1922-1936)
- Route: Southampton to New York
- Maiden voyage: 11 May 1922
- In service: April 1922
- Out of service: 19 September 1939
- Renamed: HMS Caledonia (23 April 1937)
- Fate: Caught fire and sank on 29 September 1939 and scrapped 1943

General characteristics
- Class & type: Imperator-class ocean liner
- Tonnage: 56,551 GRT, 26,324 NRT
- Length: 956.0 ft (291.4 m)
- Beam: 100.1 ft (30.5 m)
- Draft: 36 ft (11.0 m)
- Decks: 11
- Installed power: 48 boilers; 66,000 shp (49,000 kW)
- Propulsion: 4 Parsons steam turbines, 4 propellerss
- Speed: 23.5 knots (43.5 km/h; 27.0 mph) 25 knots (46 km/h; 29 mph) (maximum)
- Capacity: 2,145 passengers: 750 first class; 545 second class; 850 third class
- Notes: Never served the Hamburg America Line that it was built for. Largest ocean liner ever operated independently under the White Star Line flag.

RMS Majestic was a British ocean liner working on the White Star Line's North Atlantic run. At roughly 56,551 gross register tons, she was the largest ship ever operated by the White Star Line under its own flag and the largest ship in the world until the completion of SS Normandie in 1935.

Launched as the German liner SS Bismarck, she was the third and largest member of the German ocean liner company Hamburg America Line's trio of transatlantic liners. However, her completion was delayed by World War I. The liner never sailed under the German flag except on her sea trials in 1922. Following the war, she was finished by her German builders, handed over to the Allies as a war prize and became the White Star Line flagship RMS Majestic, replacing the sunk HMHS Britannic, which went down in the Aegean Sea, in November 1916, after hitting a mine laid by SM U-73. She was the second White Star ship to bear the name, the first being the RMS Majestic of 1889.

She served successfully throughout the 1920s, but the onset of the Great Depression made her increasingly unprofitable. She managed to struggle through the first half of the 1930s before being sold off for scrapping to Thos. W. Ward. The British Admiralty took possession of her before demolition commenced after an agreement was reached with White Star and Thomas Ward. However, due to a stipulation in her agreement as a war prize, she could not be sold for scrap. She was then converted by the Royal Navy as the training ship HMS Caledonia before catching fire in 1939 and sinking. She was subsequently raised and scrapped in 1943.

== Conception and construction ==
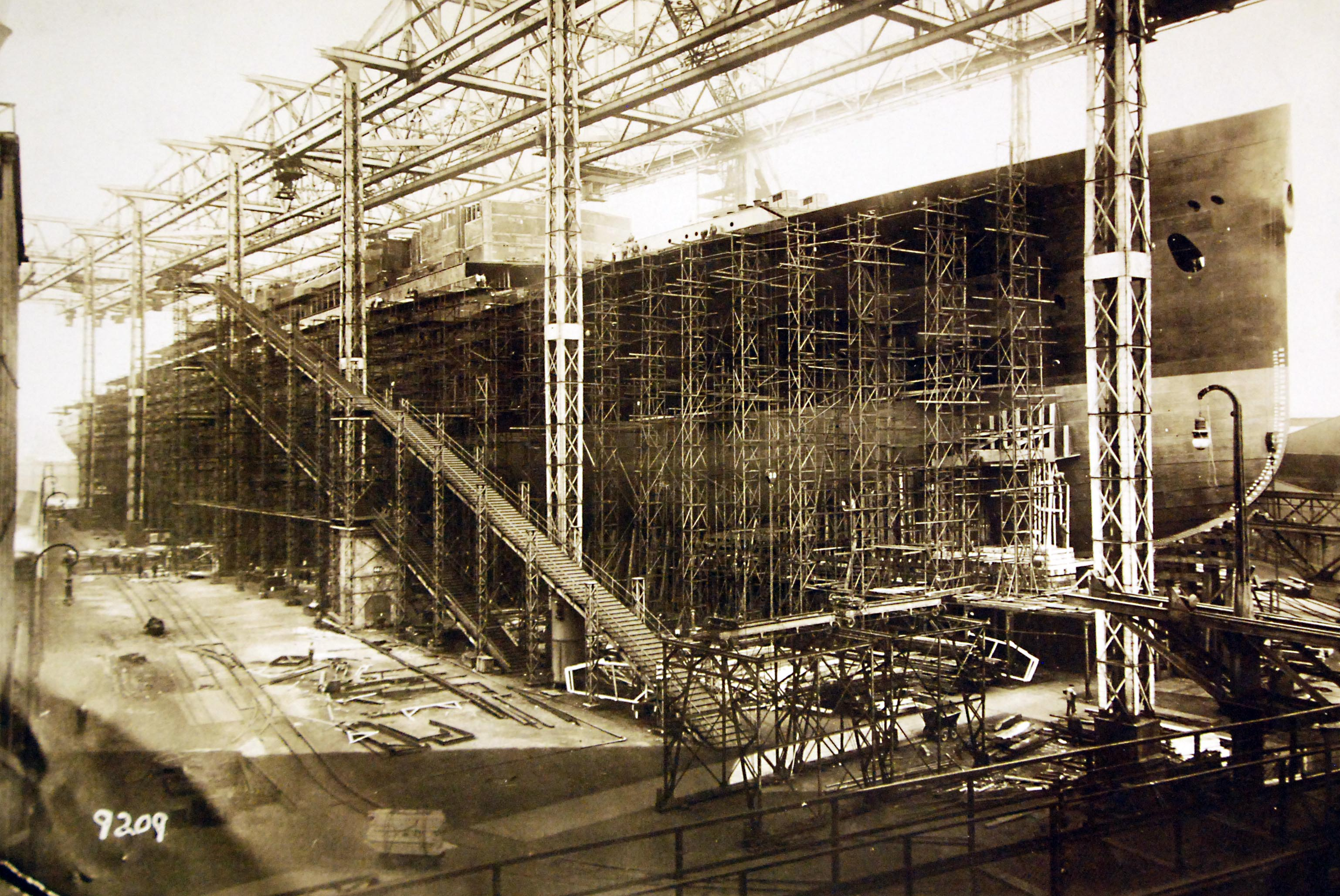
Bismarck under construction

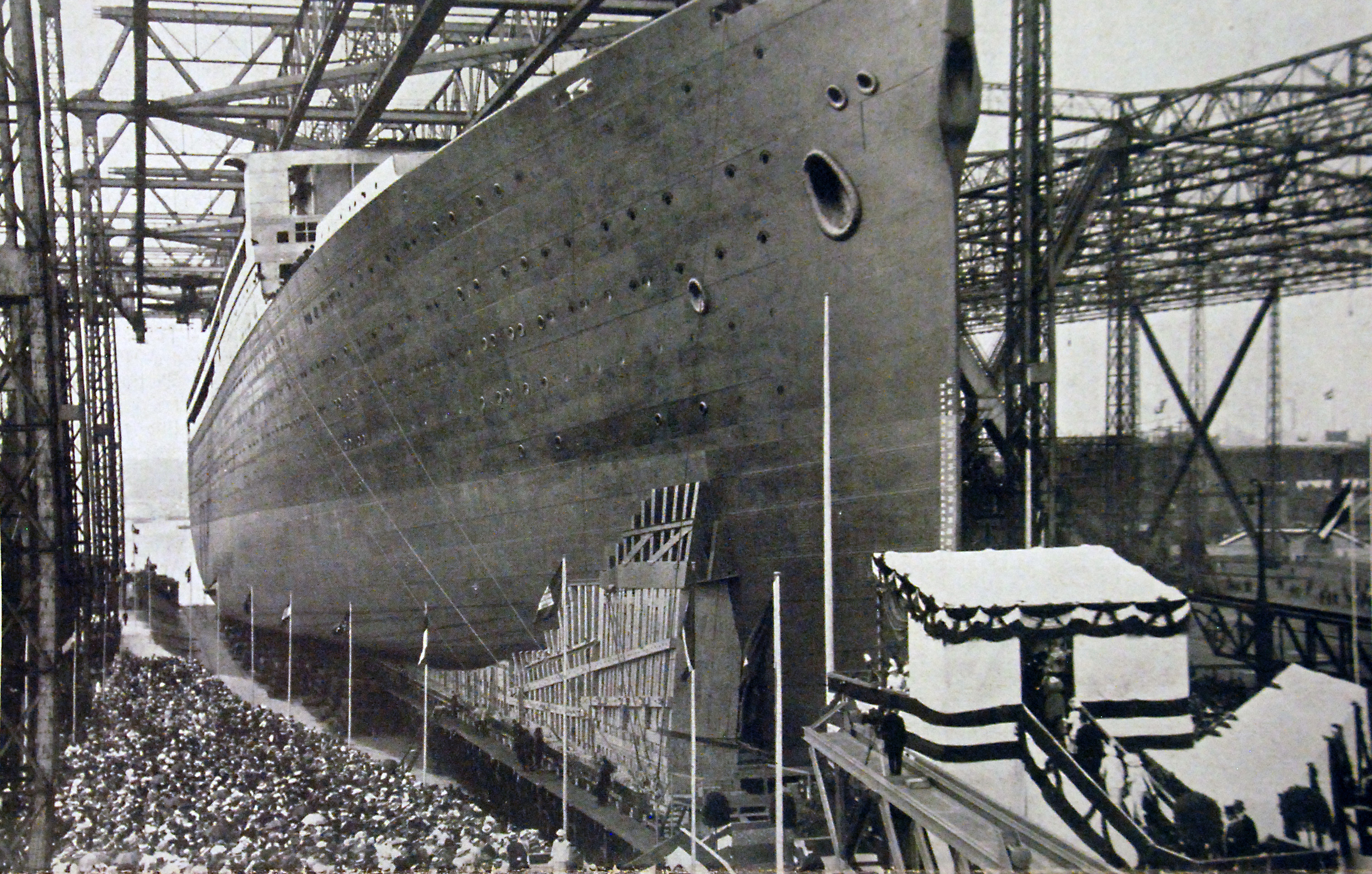
The launch of Bismarck, 20 June 1914

At the beginning of the 1910s, the German shipping companies aspired to regain the domination which had been theirs at the very beginning of the 20th century, and which had been taken from them by the liners of the Cunard Line and the Oceanic Steam Navigation Company (White Star Line), in particular RMS Lusitania, RMS Mauretania and the Olympic-class ships. It was under these circumstances that Albert Ballin, president of Hamburg America Line (HAPAG) who was close to Kaiser Wilhelm II, decided to build three liners intended to be the largest in the world. After considering having the first built by German shipyards, and the next two by the British Harland & Wolff shipyards, he decided to strengthen the patriotic symbolism carried by the trio by having all three built in Germany.

For these three liners, size and comfort were given priority. Ballin was aware that his ships could not compete with their British rivals in terms of speed. He thought of compensating for this problem by offering passengers a higher level of luxury, and called on architect Charles Mewès, who was famous for his decoration of luxury hotels. The ships were intended to transport a large number of passengers, and divided not into three classes, as is generally the case, but instead four, the last being intended for the mass transport of migrants. The sinking of RMS Titanic, which occurred during the construction of the first of the liners in the series, highlighted the need for enough lifeboats for all passengers, which was a real challenge for ships intended to carry more than 5,000 people in total. The builders therefore distributed the boats in several places on the ships, and more exclusively at the level of the upper deck.

On June 10, 1913, the first ship of the Imperator-class trio, SS Imperator, made its maiden voyage. The second, a slightly larger liner, SS Vaterland, did the same in May 1914. It was decided to name the last of the trio Bismarck. Her keel was laid shortly after the launch of the Vaterland, in the spring of 1913, in the Blohm & Voss shipyards in Hamburg, Germany, with Kaiser Wilhelm II in attendance. The original project called for the Bismarck to be similar to the Vaterland, which itself differed from the Imperator in several ways, including the fact that the ducts of its chimneys did not descend into the center of the ship, but split into smaller pipes that run along its sides, allowing for larger interior spaces. Bismarck was intended to be the same size as Vaterland, in both tonnage and length, but a miscommunication that Cunard's Aquitania would be larger made HAPAG demand an extra 6 feet (1.8 m) in length, increasing her gross tonnage. This purported news had already prompted the company to bolt an eagle-shaped figurehead to the Imperator in order to gain some precious meters. In reality, Aquitania was 50 feet (15 m) shorter than both Vaterland and Bismarck. As an employee of HAPAG noted with annoyance, these six feet were particularly expensive, since they required a total revision of the plans and the addition of two couples in the center of the ship to allow this modification of the structure. However, this allowed Bismarck to remain the largest liner ever built until the completion of SS Normandie in 1935.

Bismarck was launched on 20 June 1914 by Countess Hanna von Bismarck, the granddaughter of the 19th century German Chancellor Otto von Bismarck. During the launching ceremony Countess Bismarck had difficulty breaking the bottle of champagne herself by swinging it too late and Kaiser Wilhelm II had to assist by snatching the bottle that had missed the ship's hull and throwing it himself, finally causing it to break.

== World War I and cession to Britain ==
After launch, the fitting out of Bismarck proceeded until the start of World War I in August 1914, when it slowed and substantive work on the vessel stopped altogether. Other than maintenance work, not much more work was done on the vessel, as naval priorities occupied the ship yard until 1918. By the time the war was over, the funnels had still not been erected. During the war, brass and copper components were scavenged from the Bismarck for munitions. After being ceded to Britain under the terms of the Treaty of Versailles, the as-yet uncompleted ship was purchased jointly by the White Star and Cunard Lines, together with Imperator. Construction of the ship resumed after the end of World War I. Bismarck was ostensibly a replacement for the pre-war 48,000-ton Olympic-class ocean liner Britannic which was lost after hitting a mine in the Aegean in 1916, while the Imperator went to Cunard and became the RMS Berengaria, a replacement for the Lusitania which had been sunk by a German U-boat in 1915.

=== Completion ===
After Bismarck was sold to the White Star Line, a team of engineers were sent by Harland and Wolff, White Star's shipbuilders, to supervise completion of the ship and gather experience on her operation. Two thousand workers were mobilised on the ship, which ended up undergoing some modifications. The company requested to modify its original propulsion from coal-burning oil firing, which was more economical. On 5 October 1920, the as-yet uncompleted Bismarck was badly damaged by fire while fitting out at the shipyard. At the time of the fire, substantial progress had been made on the ship and sabotage by shipyard workers was suspected. A number of other German liners that were due to be handed over were also damaged by fire. In February 1921, the assignment of the ship to the White Star was confirmed, and its name was quickly announced: Majestic, in reference to a previous liner of the same name. The ship's funnels were installed in late May and early June 1921, then work focused on the interiors. Here too, important changes were made with regard to the distribution of passengers. To adapt to a curtailment of migration, the fourth class was abolished, and the ship was decided to carry less than 1,000 emigrants and a total of just over 2,000 passengers, far from the 4,000 of the capacity of the Imperator.

=== Sea trials ===
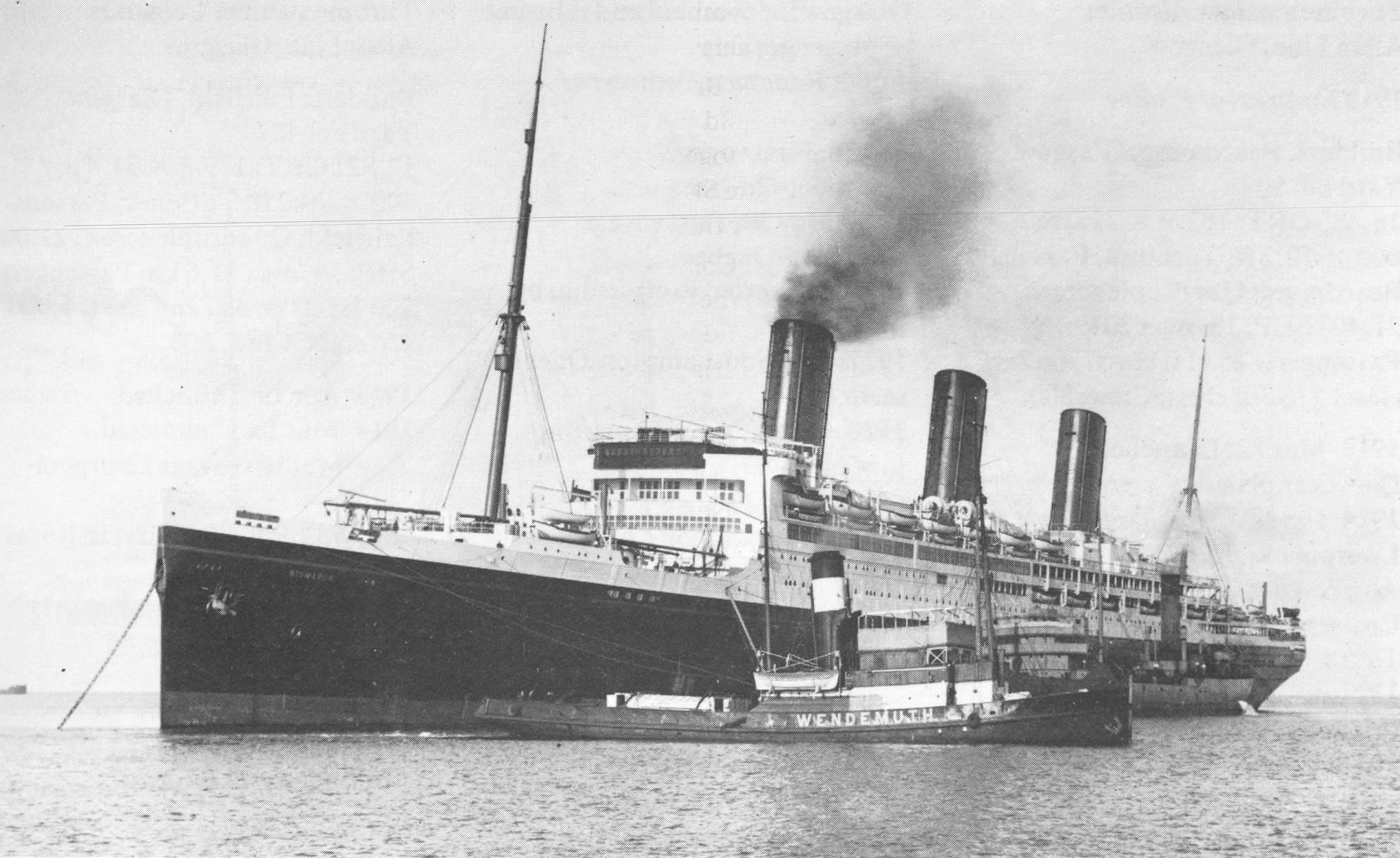
Bismarck during its sea trials

The Bismarck was completed on 28 March 1922, and Commodore Bertram Hayes and a number of officers were sent to Hamburg to take command of the ship prior to the physical handover. The transition, though not friendly, was not openly acrimonious. When Hayes and his men arrived, they found their quarters incomplete, whereas their German colleagues' cabins were finished perfectly. In the case of Captain Hayes, his temporary quarters were being used to store wash basins. These small events bore witness to the climate of tension that accompanied the handover of the ship. She was taken on her sea trials by Captain Hans Ruser of the Hamburg America Line on the afternoon of 28 March 1922. The shipbuilders completed the ship in a unique hybrid containing mostly the colors of the Hamburg-America Line, along with some White Star Line colors, with the name Bismarck painted on her bow and stern. As she departed the Hamburg docks the following day she was watched by a large number of locals in silence. Once down the river, she anchored at Cuxhaven for the night and commenced her trials proper the next day. The basic requirement was that the ship develop 66,000 horsepower (49,000 kW) and therefore she was steamed for three hours into the North Sea and back again. Briefly she ran aground after leaving at Pagensand, Schleswig-Holstein, but was refloated on the peak of high tide on 30 March and under way again.

=== Handover ===
After another week of work on the accommodation, Bismarck was accepted by the British representatives. In early April a chartered steamer arrived at Hamburg with the bulk of her new British crew; they were conveyed on board on one side of the ship, while her German crew were taken off on the other side. Upon boarding, men started re-painting the funnels in White Star colours, and painting out the name and home port "Bismarck, Hamburg", on the stern and replacing it with "Majestic, Liverpool". Majestic departed Hamburg on 9 April 1922 and arrived at Southampton at 9 am the next day (10 April), which exactly ten years earlier, the RMS Titanic had left Southampton on the same day, on her maiden voyage.

== Early career ==
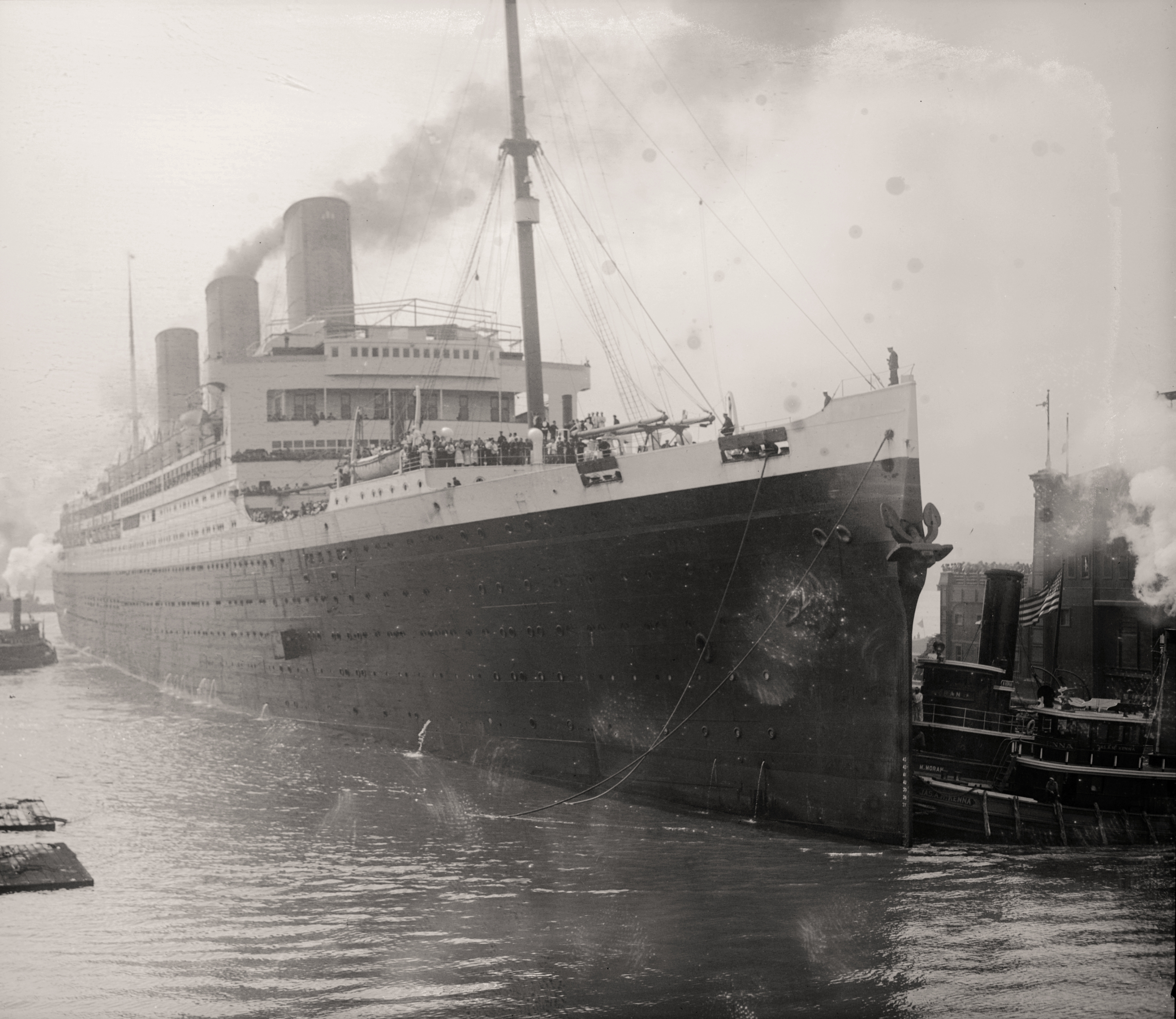
Majestic photographed at New York shortly after her acquisition by White Star Line

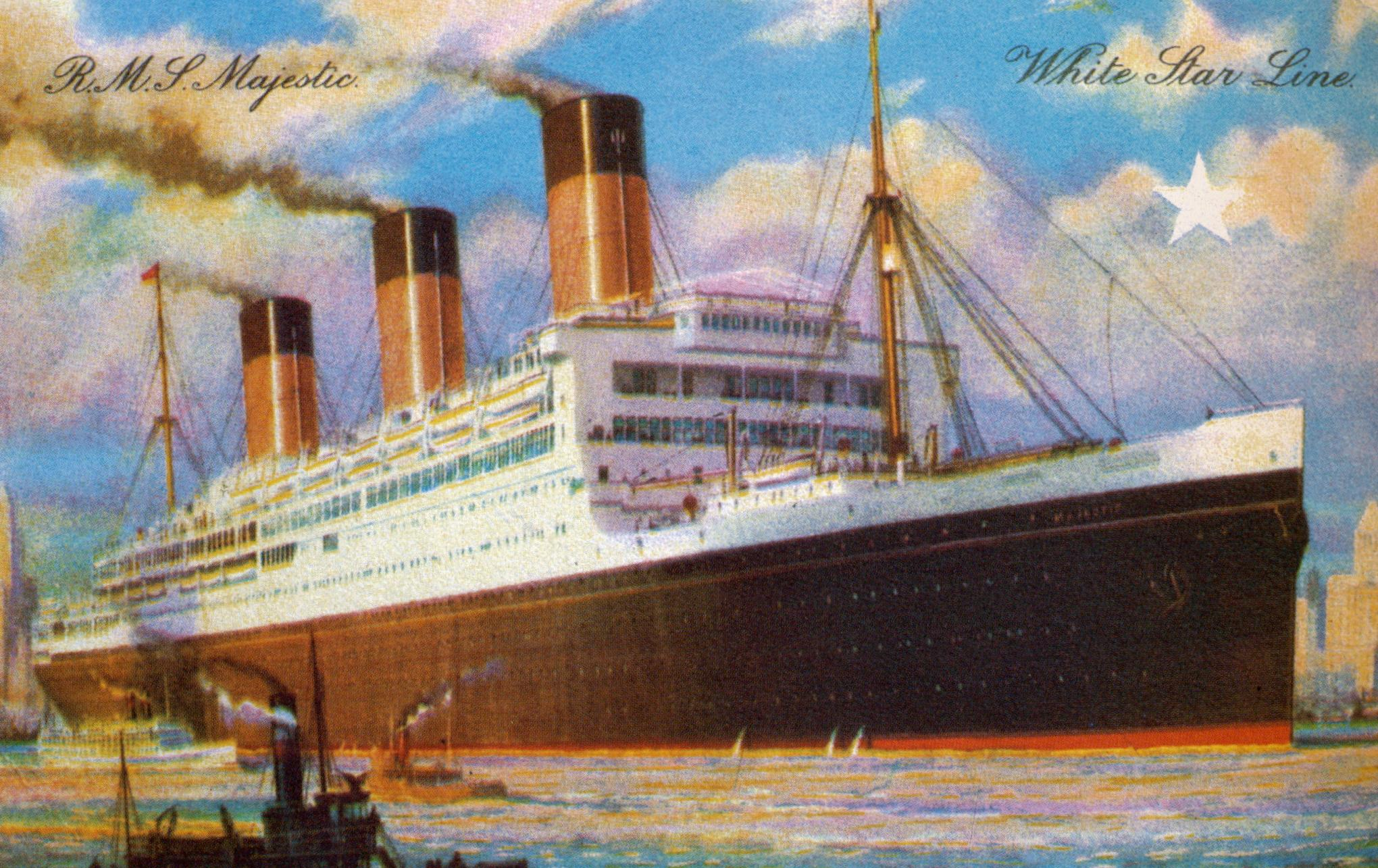
Majestic in a 1922 postcard, launched by White Star

Upon arrival in Southampton, the Majestic became the flagship of the White Star Line fleet. She was placed on the North Atlantic run from Southampton to New York in tandem with Olympic and Homeric. She sailed on her maiden voyage from Southampton on Wednesday, 11 May 1922 at 11:30 am under the command of Sir Bertram Hayes. She reached New York in 5 days, 14 hours and 45 minutes at an average speed of 22.69 knots (42.02 km/h; 26.11 mph). When she docked in New York no pier was long enough to take her, and 41 feet (12 m) of her stern projected into the Hudson River. On the eastern leg of her maiden voyage, Majestic managed to travel from New York (Ambrose Channel Lightship) to Eddystone Light, a distance of 3,139 nautical miles (5,813 km; 3,612 mi) in 5 days, 9 hours and 42 minutes at an average speed of 24.2 knots (44.8 km/h; 27.8 mph).

On 4 August 1922, Majestic arrived at Southampton and her crew were told that the next day they would be departing and anchoring off Cowes, where they would be inspected by the British monarchs George V and Queen Mary. Over night the ship was cleaned, and the next day she arrived at Cowes at 9:00. Not long after arriving a "yeoman of Signals" from the Royal Yacht arrived with the Royal Standard. The launch carrying the King and Queen arrived shortly after 11:00 am and the Royal Standard was broken on the main mast as the visitors came aboard. The guests were received by Harold A Sanderson – the Chairman of the International Merchant Marine, owners of the White Star Line and Majestic's captain, Bertram Hayes. They were given an inspection of the ship lasting an hour and a half, viewing the major public rooms and the three classes of accommodation before sitting down to lunch on B-Deck. The visit to a merchant ship by a reigning monarch was considered a great honour at the time; George V had been a naval officer until placed in the direct line of succession by the death of his brother, and took an interest in the merchant marine.

During the 1920s, the Majestic proved to be extremely popular. After her May 1922 maiden voyage, Majestic became one of the most booked liners afloat, carrying more passengers in 1923 than any other Atlantic liner. She also carried more passengers than any other ship in 1924, 1926 and 1928, and earned the affectionate nickname 'Magic Stick' from her crews and passengers.

This promising career was nevertheless disturbed by various incidents without major consequences, in particular a collision with the Berengaria at the end of 1922. However, the biggest problem experienced by the Majestic came in December 1924, when, due to a structural defect in her topsides, Majestic suffered a 100-foot (30 m) crack and had to undergo permanent repairs and strengthening along B-deck before returning to service in April 1925. Small cracks were also noted on her sister Leviathan around the same time, but only minor repairs were carried out and she developed a similar 100-foot crack five years later. The end of the 1920s saw the Majestic undergo several refits, notably in 1928, in order to adapt the ship to the decline of migratory currents on the North Atlantic. As on other ships of the time, the solution took the form of a tourist class that replaced the second class.

In 1925, Majestic completed an eastbound crossing at 25 knots, which was the fastest she ever managed, and faster than either of her sisters' best efforts. However, her older sister Leviathan often had a slightly higher average speed each year than her sister.

== Great Depression and company merger ==
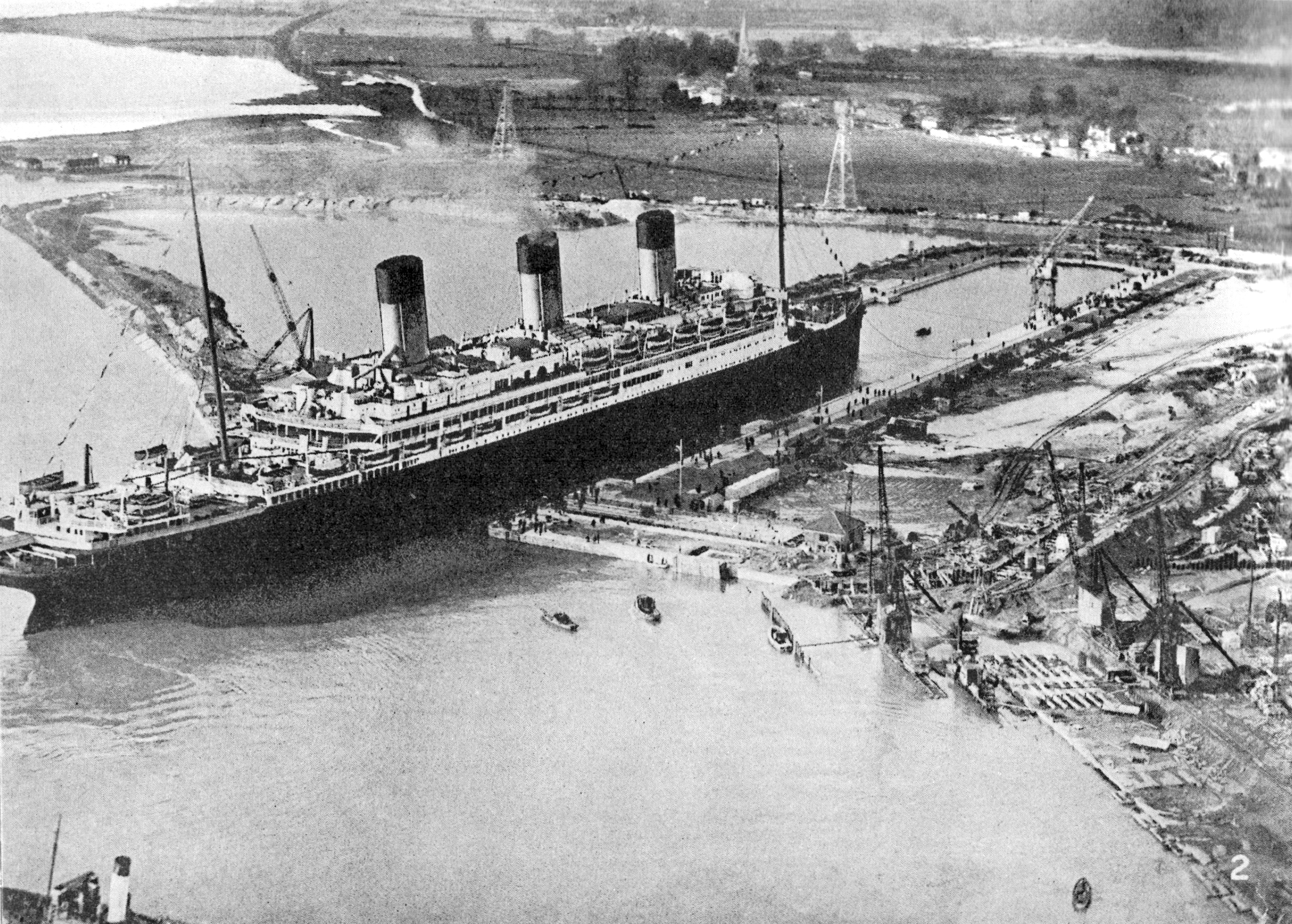
Majestic entering King George V Graving Dock at Southampton, in 1934

When the Great Depression of 1929 struck, the White Star Line was already weakened by the mismanagement of Lord Kylsant, its president for several years. Despite the success of the Majestic and the Olympic, the company had to adapt to new circumstances. The two ships then alternated between their transatlantic service and short cruises. The Majestic sometimes left New York for three to four day recreational cruises to Halifax, Nova Scotia. In these times of Prohibition in the United States, the Majestic also sometimes went on "cruises to nowhere" in order to allow its American passengers to drink alcohol during very short voyages out of territorial waters.

At the beginning of the 1930s, and while passengers became increasingly scarce, the Majestic began to suffer from repeated onboard fires, due to the poor quality of her electrical installation. This type of incident was also frequent on the Berengaria with often devastating effects, but the damage remained limited on board the Majestic. However, her structural problems continued to manifest themselves in the form of small cracks noted in the area of the ship already affected since 1924. The situation of the company worsened at the same time, although the Majestic found herself briefly in the limelight in 1932, when she transported the British delegation to the Olympic Games in Los Angeles.

Berengaria and Majestic remained jointly owned by Cunard/White Star until 1932, when Cunard terminated the joint ownership agreement. As the situation of the British shipping companies worsened, the British government managed to put pressure on White Star Line and Cunard Line in order to merge. This took place in 1934. The Majestic was among the ships that avoided being sent to the scrapyard that year. She initially continued her service. In 1934 an enormous wave smashed over her bridge in the North Atlantic, injuring the first officer and White Star's final commodore Edgar J. Trant, who was hospitalised for five weeks and never sailed again.

It was during this time that the question of the conservation of the Majestic arose. The Cunard-White Star had a surplus of tonnage, and a new flagship was due to arrive in 1936, the RMS Queen Mary. Cuts were made to try to limit spending. The Majestic's à-la-carte restaurant was closed down and its kitchen equipment immediately sold; however, this was not enough to reduce the running costs, and the company decided to dispose of one of the two giants initially built for HAPAG. The Berengaria being older, and suffering more problems due to its electrical installation, seemed the logical choice. However, operating the Majestic cost significantly more, and the need for further hull repairs remained a likely possibility. It was therefore decided that she be withdrawn from service after her final crossing on 13 February 1936, following only fourteen years in service.

== Conversion to HMS Caledonia ==
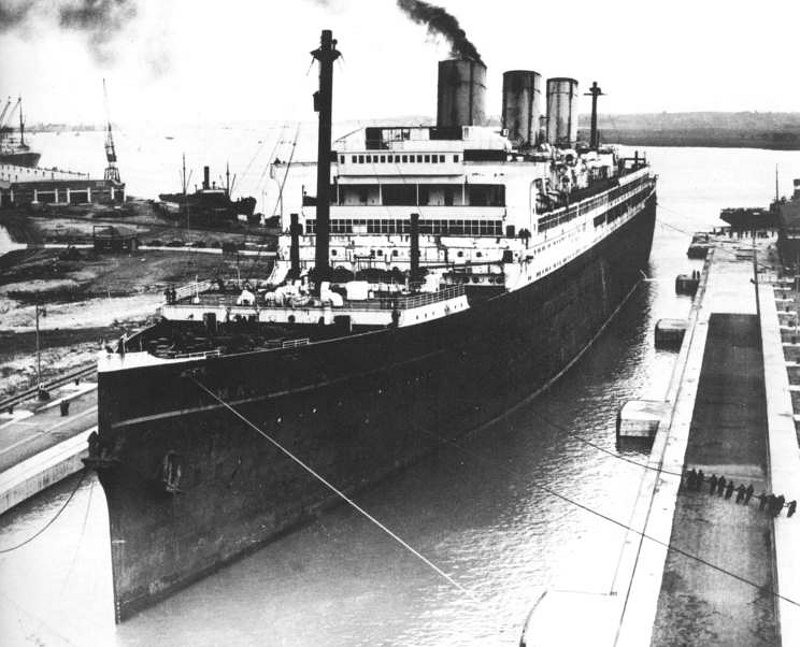
Majestic in the King George V Dry Dock having had her funnels and masts shortened as part of her conversion into HMS Caledonia

After being laid up at Southampton, the liner was sold on 15 May 1936 for £115,000 to Thos. W. Ward for scrap. The funnels and masts were shortened to allow her to pass under the Forth Bridge, in preparation for her last voyage. However, due to a stipulation in the original agreement of being a prize of war handed over to the White Star Line as compensation for lost tonnage, the ship could not be sold to Thos W. Ward, so an exchange was set up where the British Admiralty would take possession of the Majestic and give the shipbreakers twenty-four outmoded destroyers as compensation for the equivalent scrap value of Majestic. In August 1936 the ship was converted into a Boys' and Artificers' training ship and renamed HMS Caledonia. This transformation involved major changes to the liner's facilities: the lounges were transformed into gymnasiums and messes. Once their partitions had been removed, the luxury cabins became classrooms; the cadets would sleep in hammocks. The radio room was enlarged in order to train large numbers of future operators, and anti-aircraft guns were also installed for training. Only the Pompeian-style swimming pool remained unchanged. This conversion cost the Royal Navy £472,000. The ''Caledonia'' was then the largest in the British navy and could accommodate 2,500 people.

On 8 April 1937, Caledonia departed Southampton for her new base in Rosyth, and was commissioned on 23 April 1937 with a capacity of 1,500 trainees. The conversion of the liner allowed for 100 Officers, 180 Chief Petty officers and petty officers, 300 ship's company, 1500 Seamen Boys and 500 Artificer Apprentices to be accommodated on board. By the end of 1937 there were 800 Seamen Boys and 230 Apprentices on the ship's books. At the peak of her training career during 1938–1939, her books were full.

== Demise ==
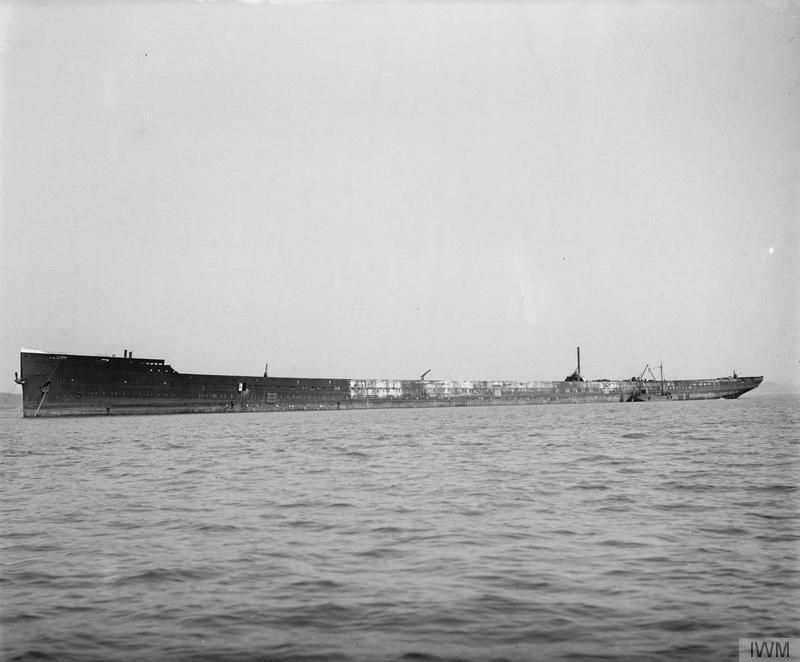
Caledonia wreck being scrapped, May 1943

After the outbreak of World War II, the trainees were removed to accommodation ashore and the ship's berth was emptied for naval use. Caledonia was temporarily anchored in the Firth of Forth pending a decision as to her disposal. On 29 September 1939, Caledonia caught fire and burnt out, sinking at her moorings. Her wreck was determined to be beyond repair and the British Admiralty sold the wreck in March 1940 to Thos W. Ward for scrap. However, she was not immediately taken to the scrapyard, and between 1940 and 1943 the wreck's superstructure was scrapped in order to lighten her as well as the sealing of underwater openings. It was not until 17 July 1943 that the hull was raised and towed to the scrapyard in Inverkeithing. The hull was completely scrapped by 1944. The bell was later placed in St Nicholas Church, Dereham.

== Characteristics ==
=== Technical aspects ===
The Majestic was the largest ship of her time, measuring 291.3 meters long by 30.5 meters at its widest point, and was assessed at 56,551 gross register tons. The liner had two masts and three funnels. The first two were used to evacuate the smoke produced by the boilers, while the third funnel was used to ventilate engine rooms. Contrary to the usual practice, and according to what has been tested on the Vaterland, the smoke was not evacuated by large ducts passing through the heart of the ship, but by thinner ducts passing inside its sides. This allowed much larger space for passengers inside the ship.

The Majestic was propelled by a set of quadruple propellers driven by four direct drive Parsons turbines. The port centre propeller shaft was driven by a high-pressure turbine, which exhausted to an intermediate pressure turbine that drove the starboard centre shaft. These two turbines were located in the forward watertight compartment. Exhaust from the intermediate turbine was divided equally and fed into two low-pressure turbines on the outer shafts located in a separate compartment aft. The steam turbines generated approximately 66,000 shaft horsepower (49,000 kW) when running at 180 rpm. Each one of the low-pressure turbines weighed 375 tons. Steam was supplied to the turbines at 260 psi by 48 Yarrow & Normand water-tube boilers located in four watertight compartments. The boilers had a heating surface of 220,000 square feet (20,000 m^{2}) and there was a total of 240 oil burners fitted to them. Bismarck was originally designed to burn coal but was converted to oil while being completed at Blohm & Voss. The ship could reach a maximum speed of 25 knots, among the fastest of its time but still slower than the Mauretania.

Majestic’s main problem was her electrical installation. The cables of German origin installed on the liner and her sister ships suffered from electrical fires, an issue which also plagued the career of the Berengaria (ex-Imperator), whose facilities were several times partially ravaged by fire, eventually leading to her withdrawal from service. As far as the Majestic was concerned, incidents remained limited during its commercial career; however, it was this wiring which triggered the fire onboard the liner after her transformation into a military training ship in September 1939. The Vaterland was the only sister ship to escape these incidents; her entire electrical installation was modified when the Americans took ownership of her and renamed her Leviathan.

=== Facilities ===
Similar to her two sister ships, the then-named Bismarck was originally designed to offer four classes to its more than 4,000 passengers traveling in conditions ranging from the luxurious Imperial Suite with veranda to the steerage dormitories. In the early 1920s, however, the United States began to tighten its conditions of access to migrants. The accommodation capacity of the Majestic when it entered service in 1922 was modified to carry 700 passengers in first class, 545 in second, and 850 in third. Its accommodation was revised in 1926 to accommodate a tourist class, which completely replaced the second class in 1931.

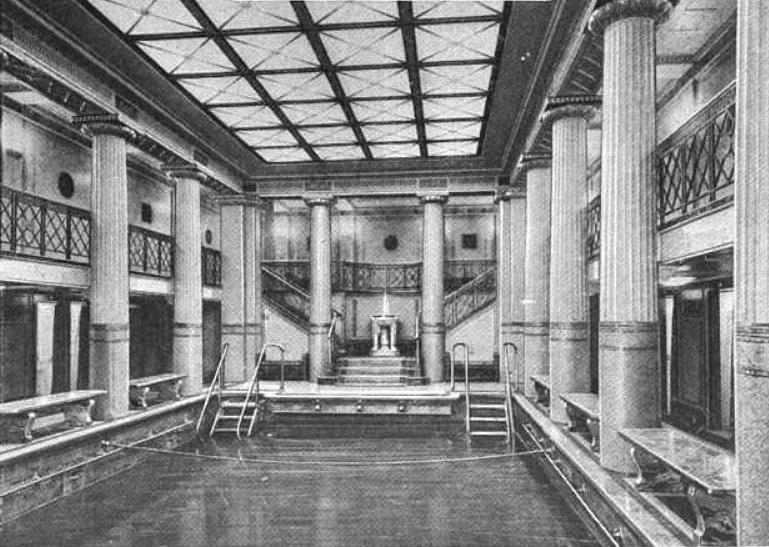
Swimming pool aboard Majestic circa 1922

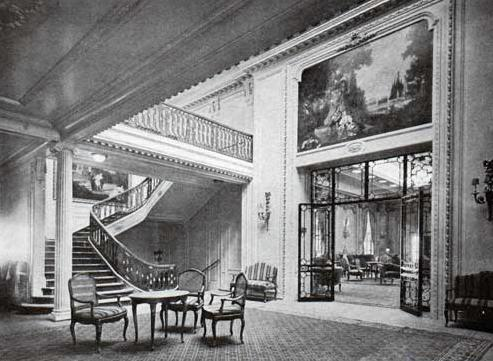
Entrance foyer of Majestic

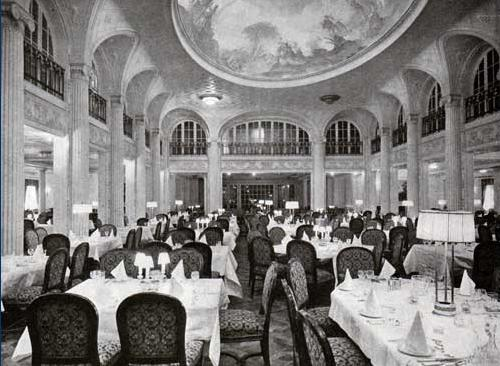
First-class dining saloon aboard Majestic, 1922

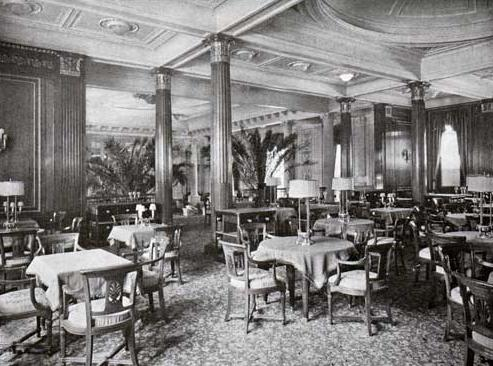
À La Carte Restaurant aboard Majestic, photographed in 1922

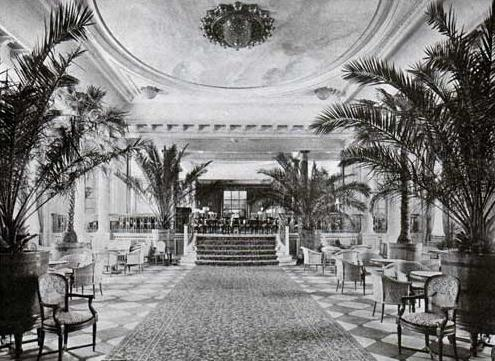
The Verandah Café of Majestic, circa 1922

First class lounge entrance

The interior of the ship was designed by Charles Mewès prior to the start of World War I, but he died in 1914 and never saw the completed ship. Despite this, his plans were suitable for the White Star Line, which did not adapt them until shortly before the ship was put into service. This design was distinguished in particular by its dining room spread over two decks, then the largest ever built on a ship, as well as by its large living room decorated with oak panels, which gave it an aspect similar to the lounge on board RMS Olympic, but in much larger dimensions. Another striking installation on the ship was its swimming pool decorated in a Pompeian style, which contrasted with the sober basin installed on the Olympic-class ships. The liner also offered other meeting places for passengers, in particular a veranda café and an à-la-carte restaurant for passengers who wanted meals different from those offered in the main dining room. While the first class cabins and facilities were located in the center of the ship, the second class offered cabins with two to four berths, located aft of the first class. Finally, the third-class facilities extended over three decks, right at the stern.

== Gallery ==
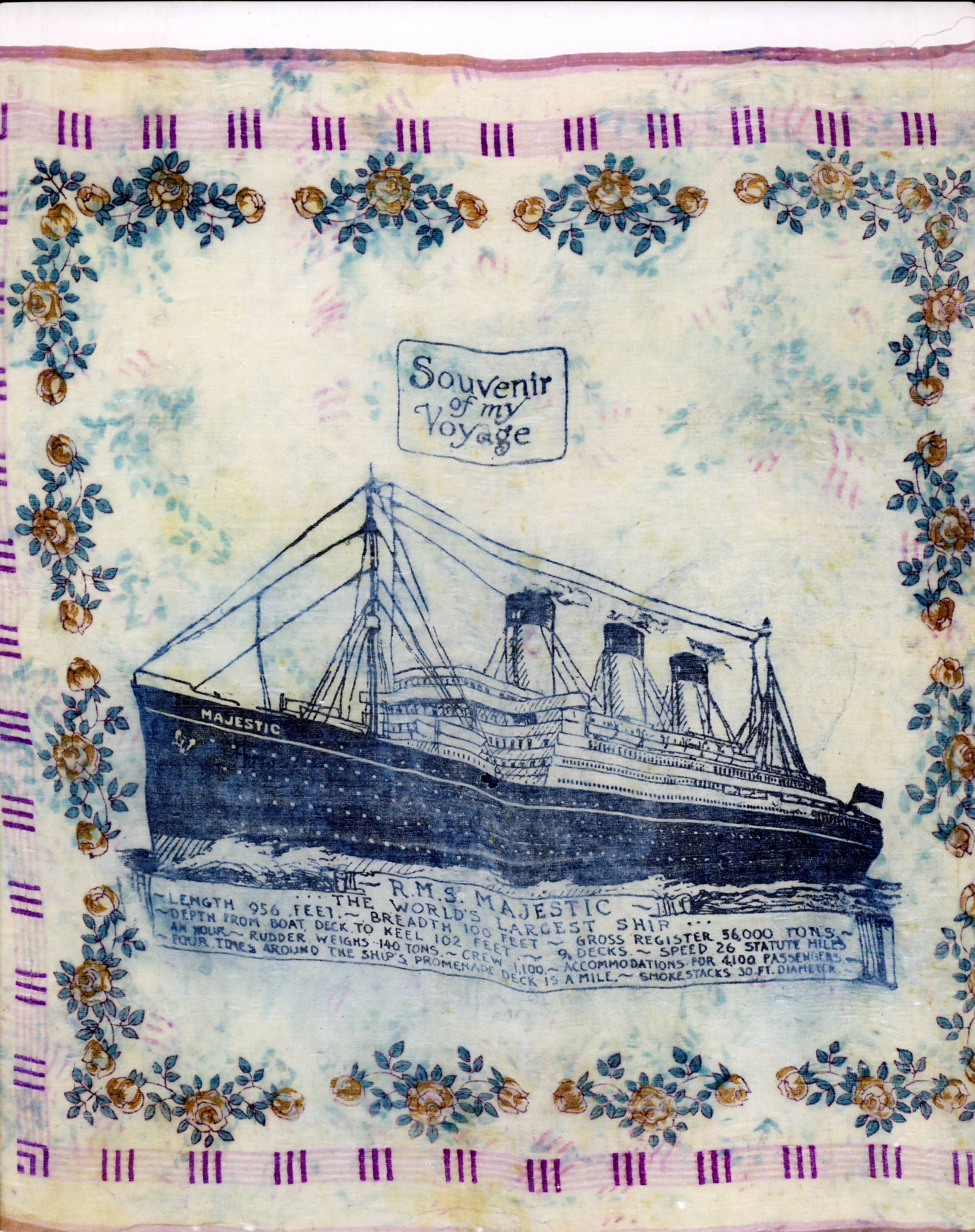
Handkerchief Souvenir from Majestic

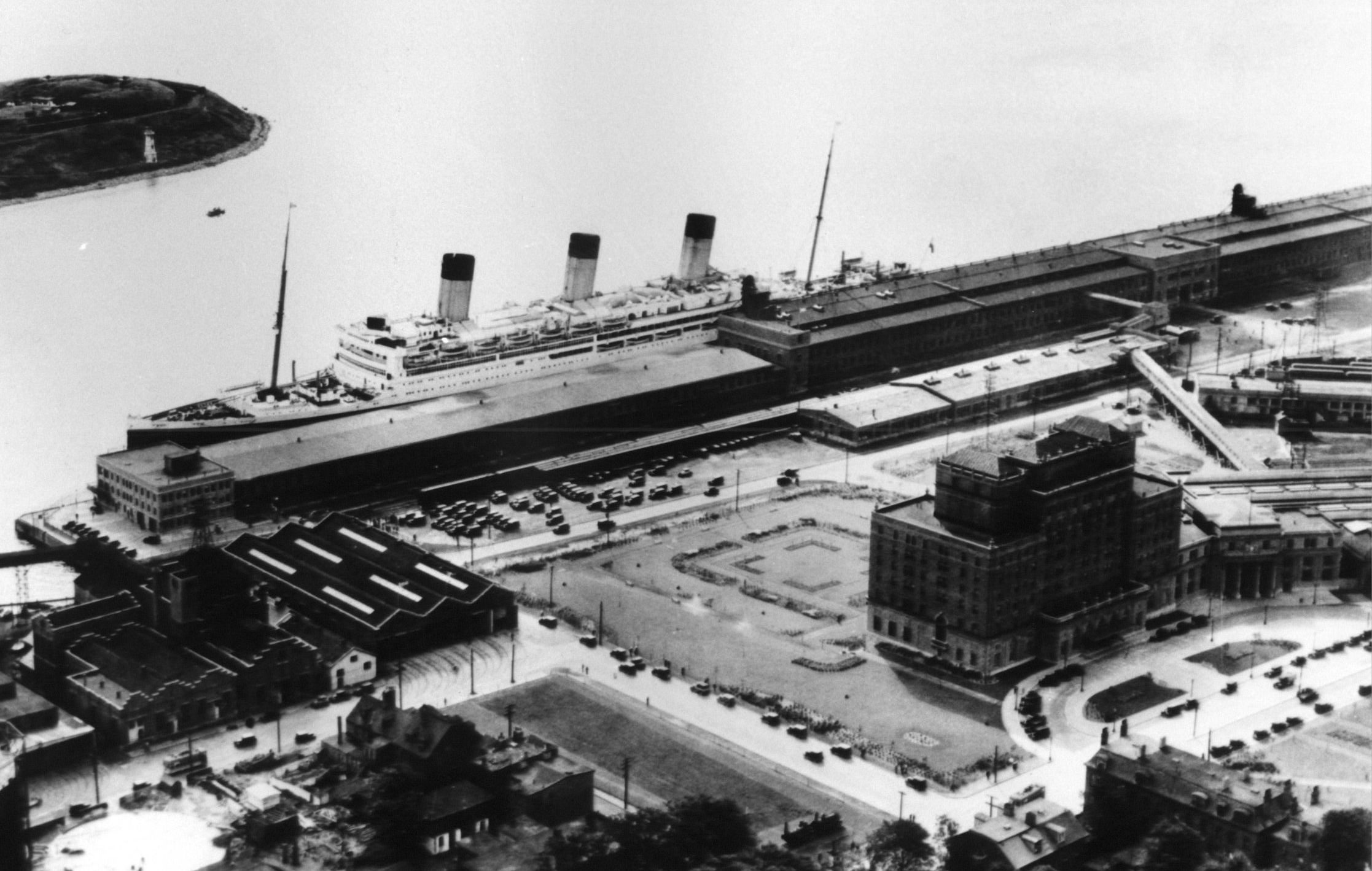
Majestic at Pier 21 at Halifax, Nova Scotia, Canada in 1934

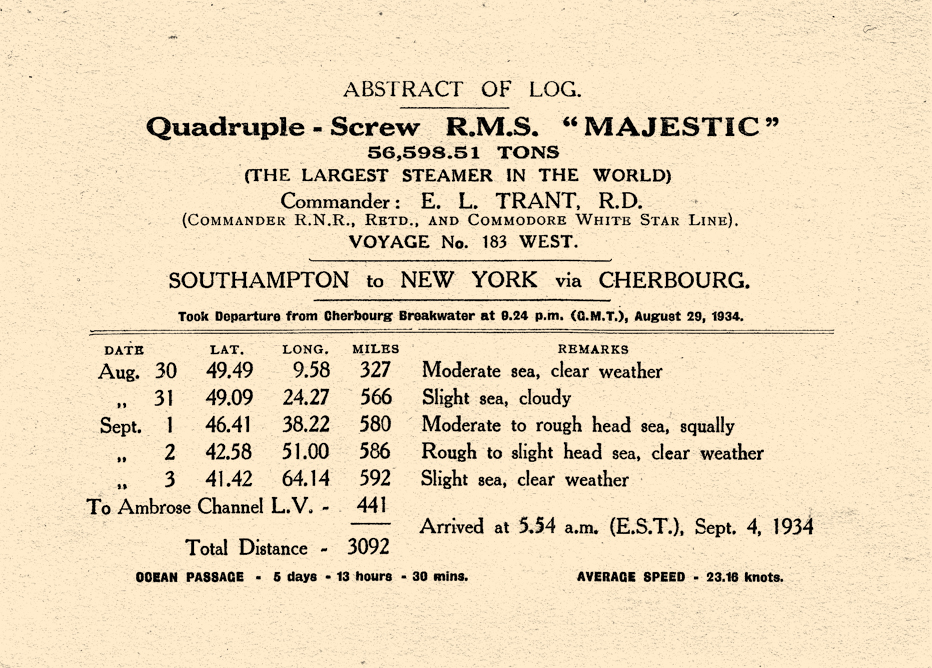
Abstract of Log for a typical Westbound voyage (1934)

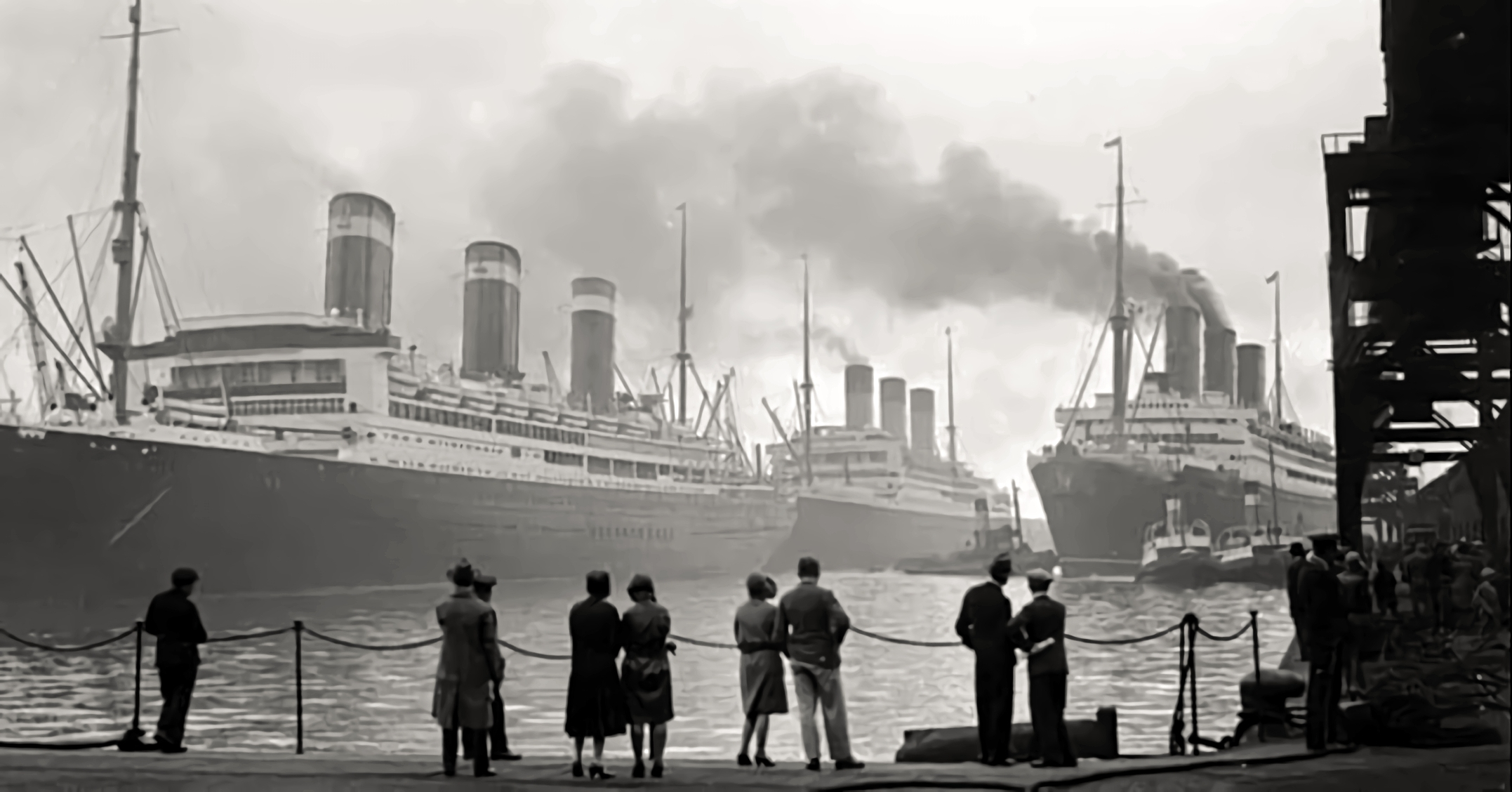
Majestic with Berengaria (Ex Imperator) and Leviathan (Ex Vaterland)

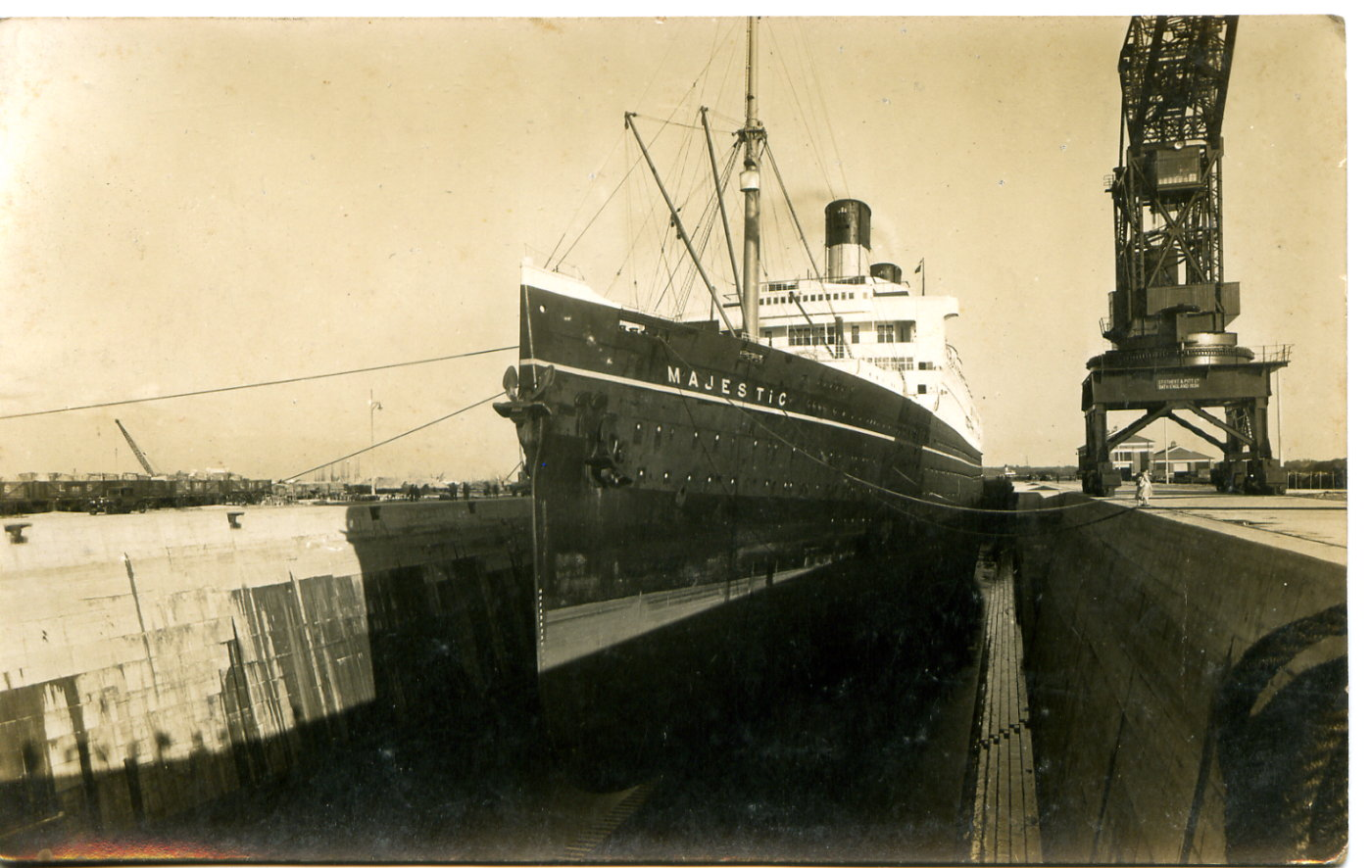
RMS Majestic in King George V dry dock, Southampton

== Bibliography ==
- Anderson, Roy Claude (1964). White Star. Prescot: T. Stephenson & Sons Ltd. OCLC 3134809.
- de Kerbrech, Richard P. (2009). Ships of the White Star Line. Hersham: Ian Allan Publishing. ISBN 978-0-7110-3366-5. OCLC 298597975.
- Eaton, John P.; Haas, Charles A. (1989). Falling Star: Misadventures of White Star Line Ships. Wellingborough: Patrick Stephens Ltd. ISBN 1-85260-084-5. OCLC 20935102.
- Haws, Duncan (1990). White Star Line. Merchant Fleets. Vol. 17. Hereford: TCL Publications. ISBN 0-946378-16-9. OCLC 50214776.
- Layton, J. Kent (2013). The Edwardian Superliners: A Trio of Trios. Stroud: Amberley. ISBN 978-1-4456-1438-0. OCLC 851154660.
