= Imperator-class ocean liner =

Ship class

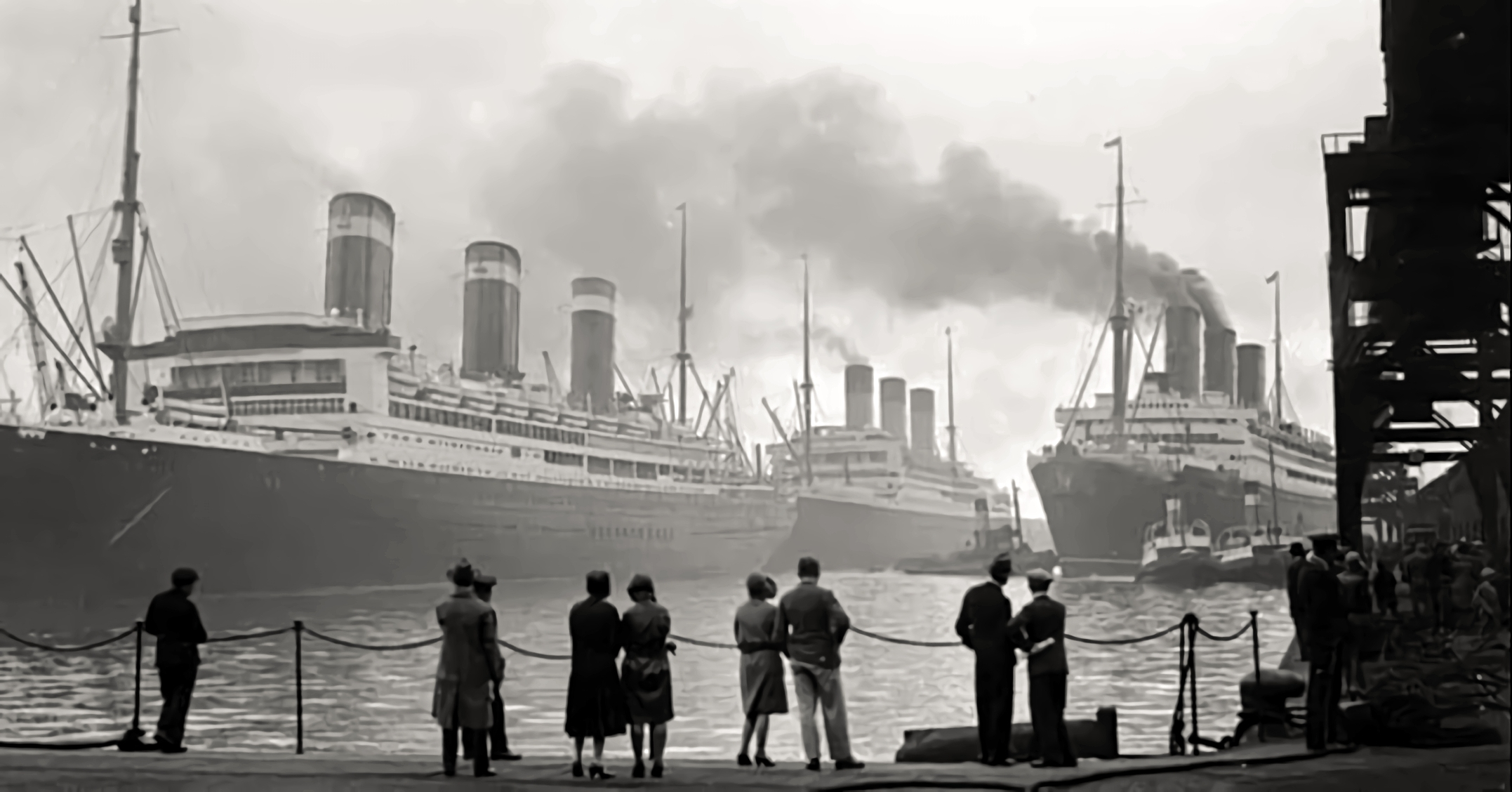
- Photograph of the three Imperator-class liners from left to right: SS Leviathan (former SS Vaterland), RMS Majestic (former SS Bismarck), and RMS Berengaria (former SS Imperator), photographed side by side in Southampton, England after being handed over to the Allies as World War I reparations.

Class overview
- Builders: Imperator: AG Vulcan Stettin, Germany Vaterland/Majestic: Blohm+Voss, Hamburg, Germany
- Built: 1912–1914
- In service: 1913–1946
- Planned: 3
- Completed: 3
- Lost: 1
- Retired: 2

General characteristics
- Type: Ocean liner
- Tonnage: 52,117 - 56,551 GRT
- Length: 906–956 ft (276–291 m)
- Beam: 98 ft 3 in (29.9 m) to 100 ft 1 in (30.5 m)
- Draught: 35 ft 2 in (10.7 m) to 37 ft 9 in (11.5 m)
- Decks: 11

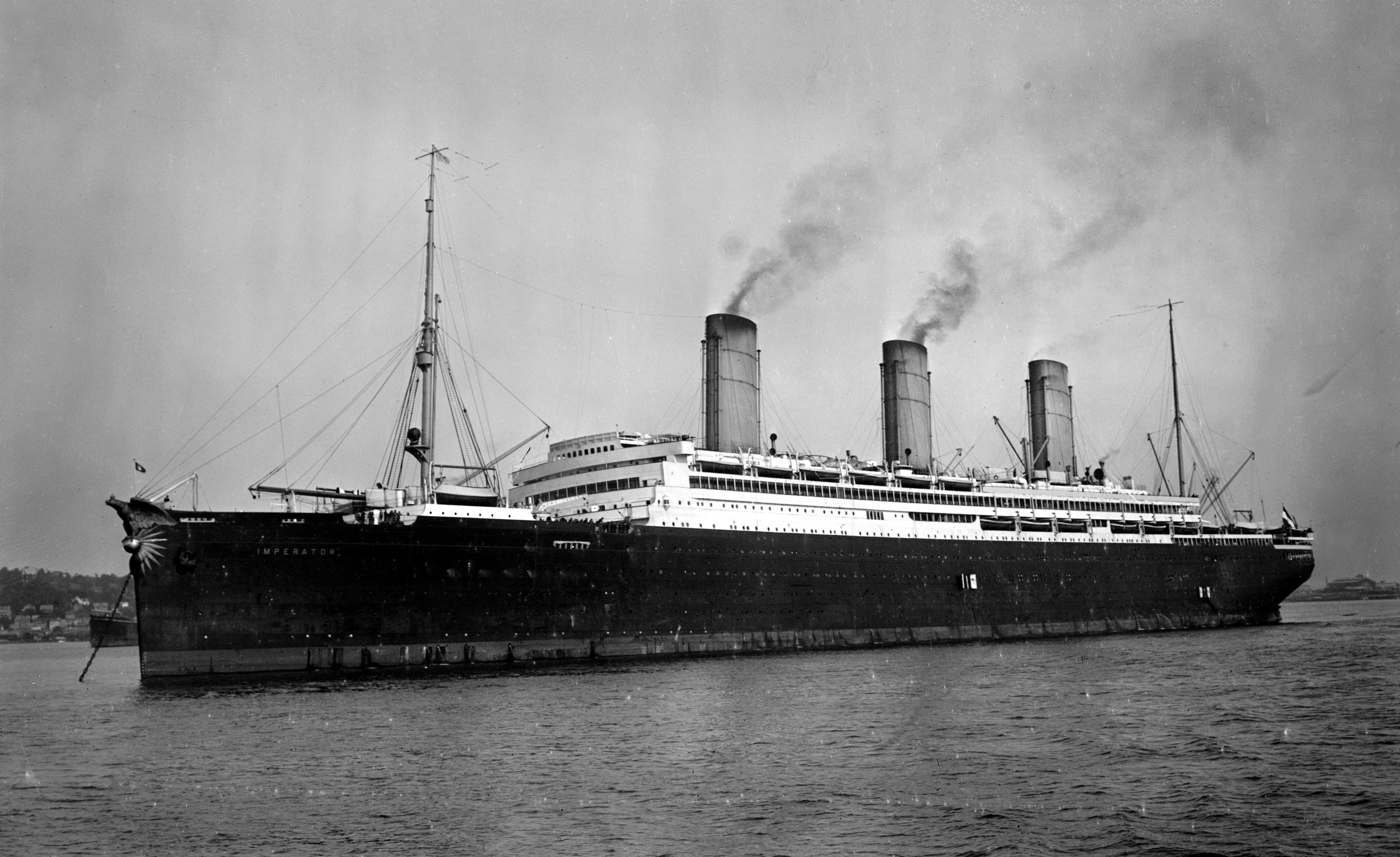
SS Imperator

The Imperator-class was a series of three large ocean liners designed and built for the Hamburg America Line (HAPAG). Envisaged by HAPAG chairman, Albert Ballin, the three ships - Imperator, launched in 1912; Vaterland, launched in 1913; and Bismarck, launched in 1914 - each displaced over 50,000 tons, with each successively holding the title of the world's largest passenger ship. Vaterland was seized by the United States during the First World War, while Imperator and Bismarck were turned over to the Allies as reparations following the war's end.

== Background ==
The Hamburg America Line was one of two German shipping companies which operated transatlantic crossings, the other being North German Lloyd. The latter had had much success with the advent of their so-called Kaiser-class ocean liners, the first of which was the Kaiser Wilhelm der Grosse. Lloyd soon had a fleet of four liners with weekly transatlantic crossings on offer. By the turn of the century, HAPAG had only one flagship the Deutschland. Though successful, the Deutschland could not rival the "Four Flyers" owned by Lloyd. HAPAG soon added the Kaiserin Auguste Viktoria to their fleet which was the largest ship in the world at its launch in August 1906. British competition was also fierce, Cunard's Lusitania launched in 1906 followed by her sister Mauretania were an instant success and by 1910, the new Olympic-class ocean liners of White Star were nearing completion.

== Ships ==
=== Imperator ===
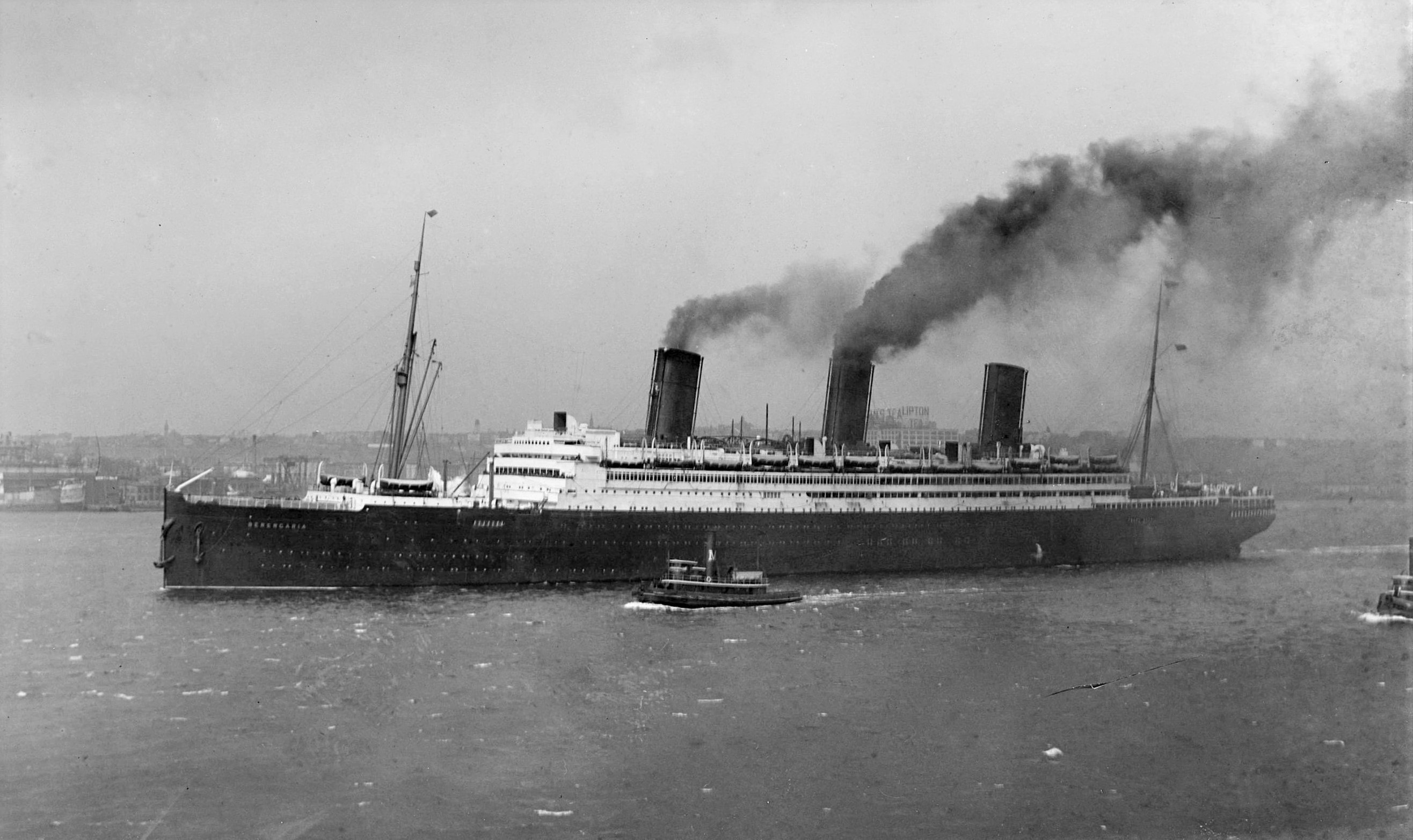
RMS Berengaria photographed during the 1920s.

Laid down on 18 June 1910, Imperator would be the largest ship in the world by the time it was completed in June 1913. The title of world's largest ship would be taken from White Star Line's RMS Olympic by a significant margin. Praised for having spacious interiors, Imperator would suffer from stability issues, as it had been discovered that her center of gravity was too high. A refit in October 1913 would attempt to resolve the issue by reducing the height of the funnels and replacing heavy furniture. Imperator's service to Germany would not last long as World War I saw her laid up at Hamburg. She remained inactive for the entirety of the war. After the Armistice of 11 November 1918, Imperator was seized by the U.S. and tasked with bringing American service personnel home from France. Following her service as USS Imperator (ID-4080), she was transferred to the Cunard Line to replace the RMS Lusitania which sank in 1915. After a number of overhauls, Imperator was renamed after the English queen Berengaria of Naverre, in February 1921. Berengaria then became the flagship of the Cunard fleet, serving out a long career. After numerous electrical fires caused by aging wiring, Berengaria was set to be scrapped in 1938. She was completely demolished by 1946 due to the outbreak of World War II.

=== Vaterland ===
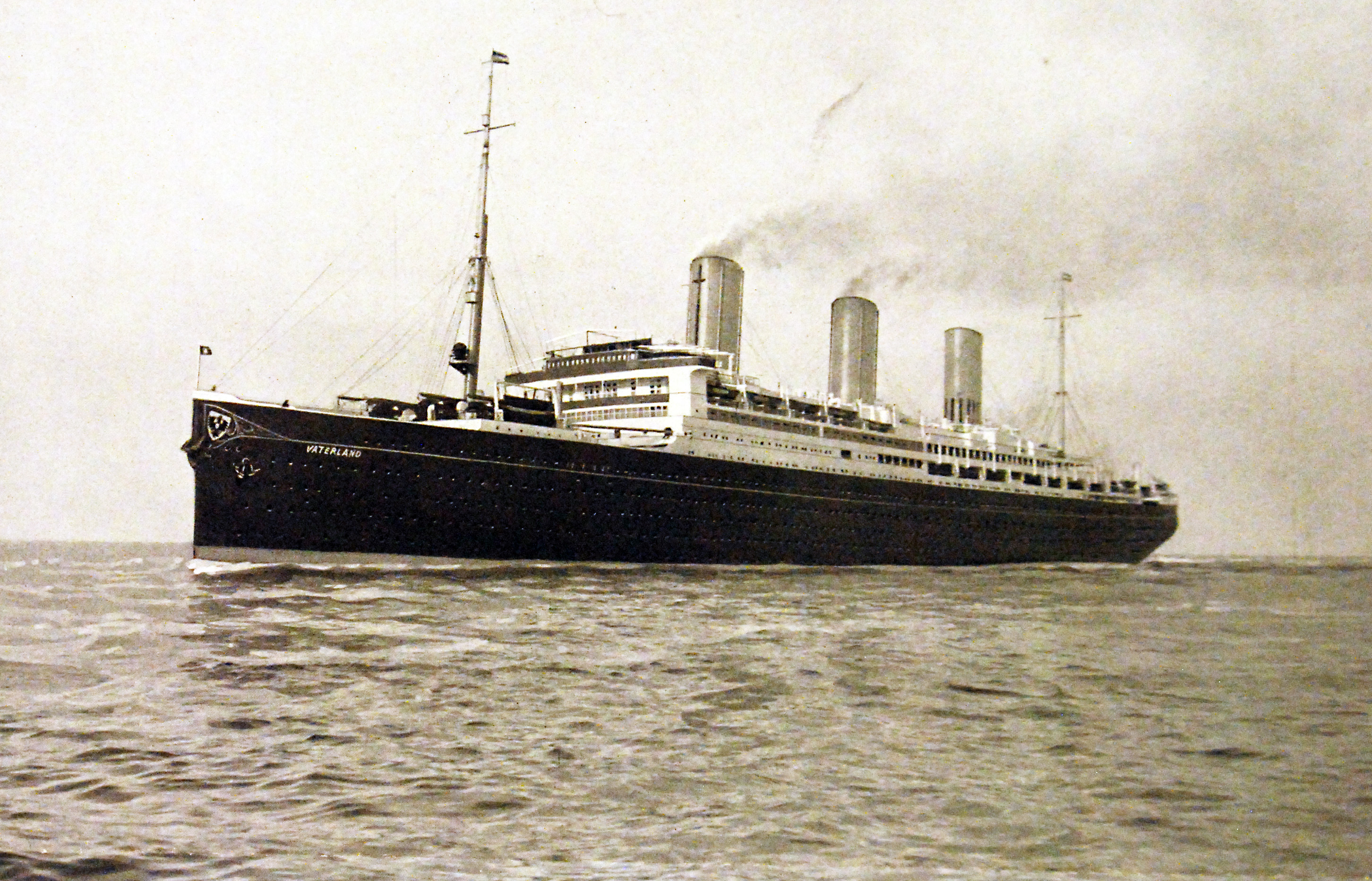
SS Vaterland at sea, 1914

Being the second member of the Imperator-class, Vaterland significantly improved upon the design of her elder sister Imperator. Launched on 3 April 1913, she would take the title of world's largest ship when completed on 29 April 1914. Her German career was short as she would later be taken by the United States as a war prize for World War I, and she would continue her career as SS Leviathan. Even though Leviathan was extremely popular, as she was the largest flagged American ocean liner at the time, her American career would ultimately prove to be unsuccessful due to a lack of running mates which caused huge gaps in her running schedule, and the fact that prohibition made her a dry ship. The Great Depression ended her career once, and for all. Her final running year in 1936 was her most unprofitable year in service, and she was laid up for scrap. In 1937 she was sold to the British Metal Industries Ltd. On January 26, 1938, Leviathan set out on her 301st and last transatlantic voyage under the command of Captain John Binks. Leviathan arrived at Rosyth, Scotland, on 14 February for scrapping. Her large size, and World War II would result in final demolition taking place in 1946.

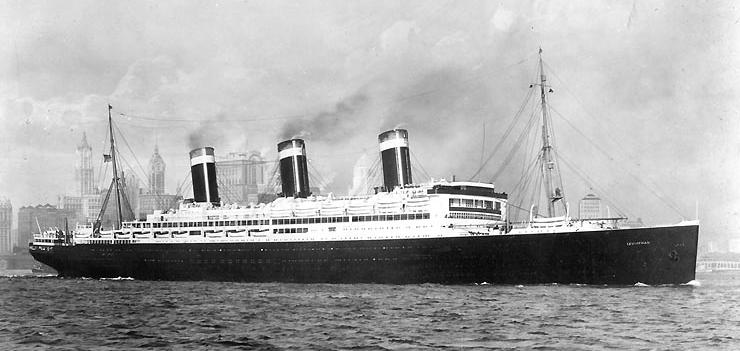
SS Leviathan after she began service under the United States Lines steaming out of New York Harbor, circa the mid-1920s.

=== Bismarck (Majestic) ===
She was awarded to the White Star Line for the loss of HMHS Britannic during World War I. She served successfully throughout the 1920s for the White Star Line but the onset of the Great Depression made her increasingly unprofitable. She managed to struggle through the first half of the 1930s before being sold off for scrapping to Thos. W. Ward. The British Admiralty took possession of her before demolition commenced after an agreement was reached with White Star and Thomas Ward. She served the Royal Navy as the training ship HMS Caledonia before catching fire in 1939 and sinking. She was subsequently raised and scrapped in 1943. She never operated under the name Bismarck.

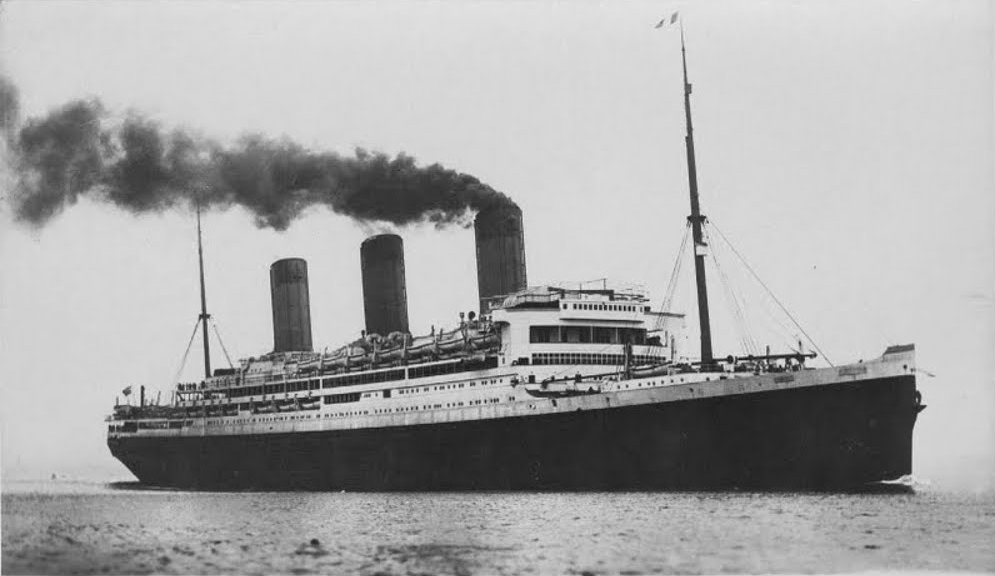
RMS Majestic photographed around 1922

== Gallery ==
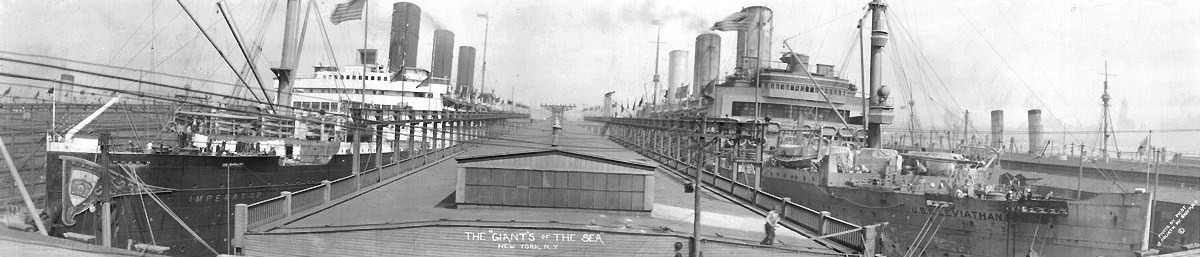
USS Imperator (ID-4080), at left, and USS Leviathan (ID-1326) at Hoboken, New Jersey.

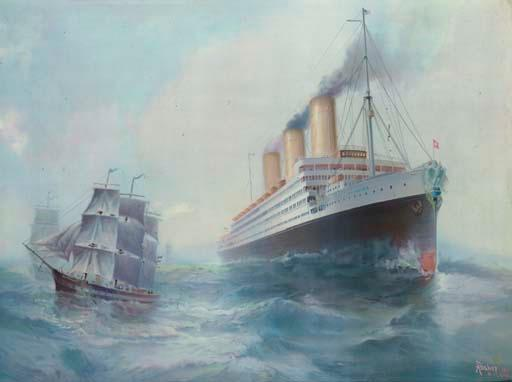
The SS Imperator of the Hamburg America Line after A.F. Bishop

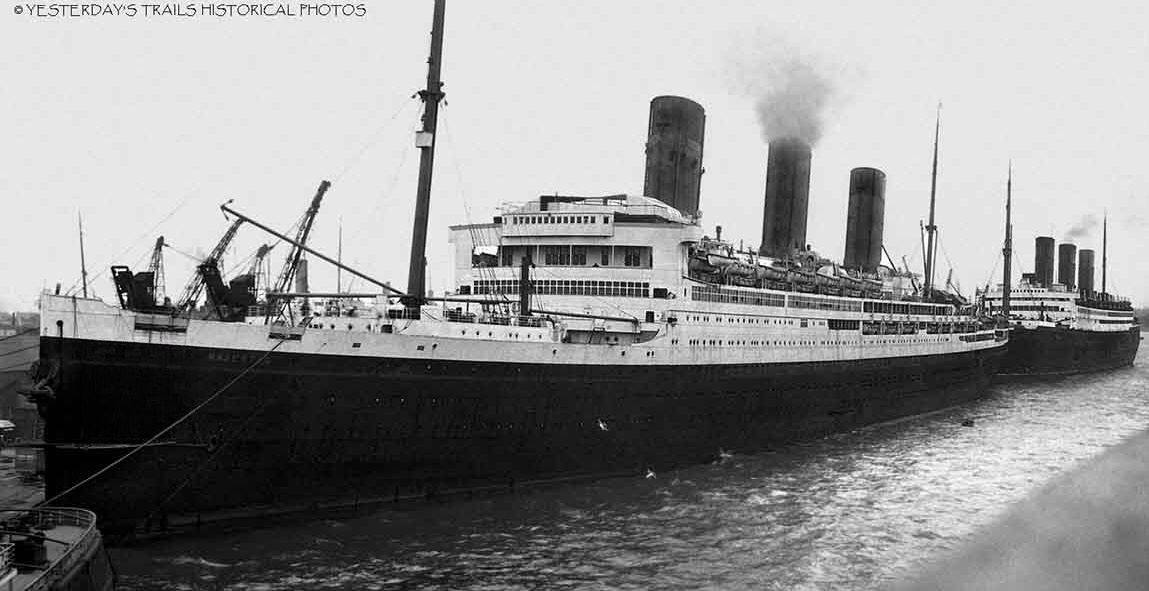
RMS Majestic and RMS Berengaria, Southampton 1922

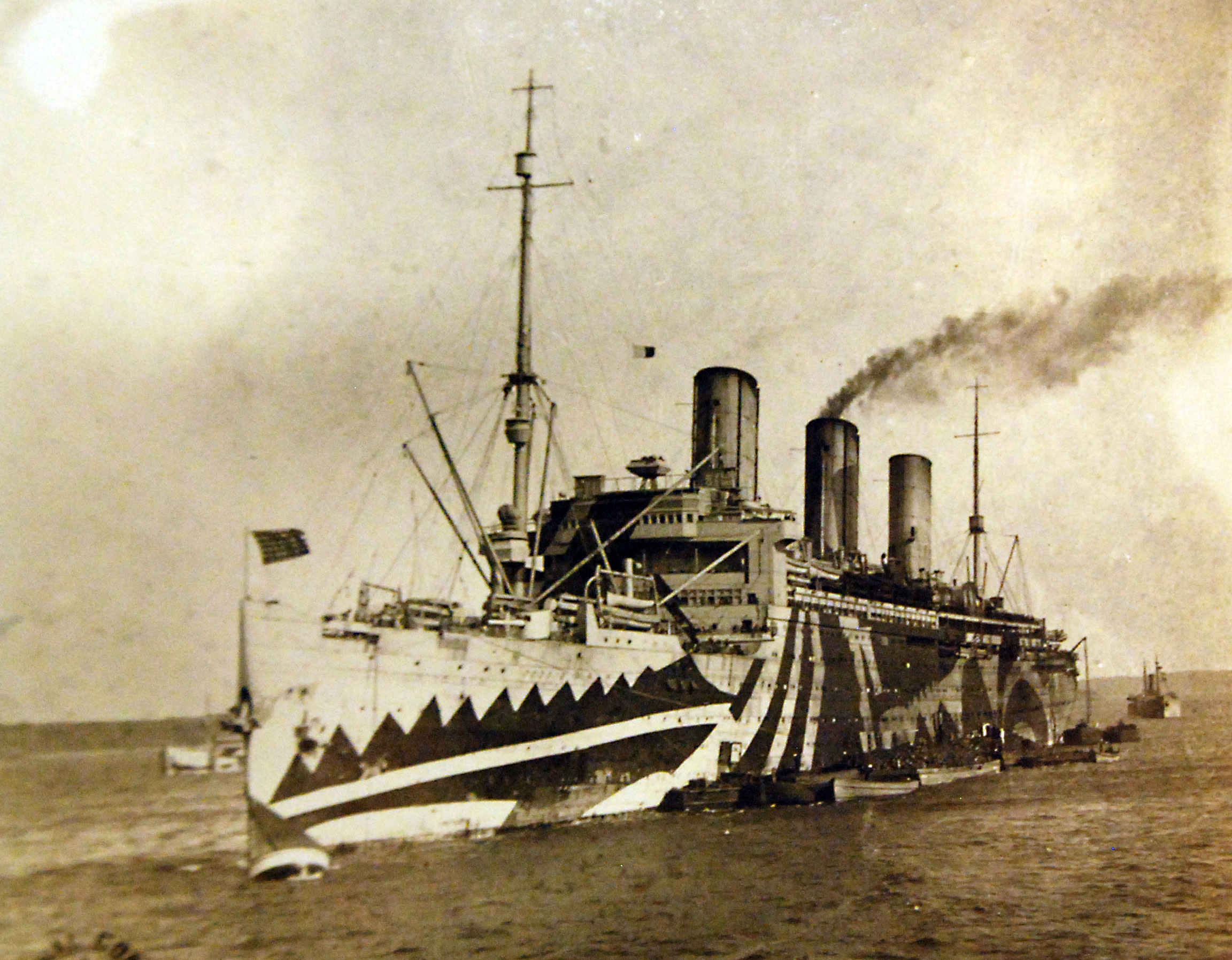
USS Leviathan being used to transport American troops, Brest, France, May 30, 1918

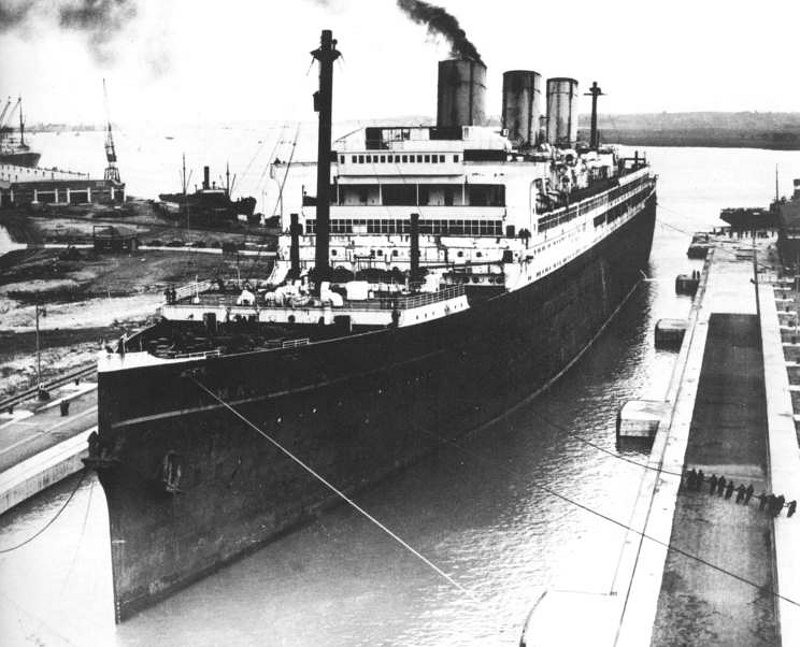
RMS Majestic being converted into HMS Caledonia
