= SS Athen (1893) =

German merchant ship built in 1893 that sunk in 1906

Coordinates: 50.440°N 2.344°W

History

Germany
- Name: SS Athen
- Owner: A. C. de Freitas & Co. Hamburg
- Builder: Richardson, Duck & Co., Thornaby (Stockton-on-Tees)
- Yard number: 406
- Laid down: 1893
- Launched: 31 January 1893
- Commissioned: July 1893
- Decommissioned: 1906
- In service: 1893
- Out of service: 1906
- Stricken: 1906
- Home port: Hamburg
- Fate: Sank following collision 8 March 1906

General characteristics
- Tonnage: 2206 gross register tons
- Length: 84.6 metres
- Height: 11.4 metres
- Installed power: 210
- Propulsion: steam
- Speed: 9 knots

SS Athen was a German merchant ship lost off Portland Bill in the English Channel in 1906. Today, the wreck becomes a dive site.

== History ==
The steam cargo ship was originally built in 1893 as yard number 406 by British builders Richardson, Duck & Co., located in Thornaby, Stockton-on-Tees. The engine was built by Blair & Co. Ltd., also in Stockton-on-Tees. The iron cargo ship was launched in June 1893 in Stockton. SS Athen was a single screw vessel with a 1 × 3 cyl. triple expansion engine (serial No. 1149), consisting of two boilers and a single shaft. She managed 9 knots on her trial, and was 2,199 grt, whilst having dimensions of 277.5 and 37.5 feet. The ship was owned by A. C. de Freitas & Co. in Hamburg until 1901, when it was sold to Hamburg Amerikanische Packetfahrt A.G. - Hamburg-Amerika Linie - HAPAG of Hamburg. It was sold again in 1903 to its third and final owners Gätjens & Jarke in Hamburg.

The ship sank on 18 March 1906 as the result of a collision on passage from Cardiff for Antwerp with patent fuel when collided with the British steamer SS Thor off Portland Bill. The wreck today lies at a minimum depth of 51 metres and a max of 57, about 8–10 miles south-east off Portland Bill. The wreck sits upright and complete although the majority of decking has collapsed inwards. The engine remains visible, whilst the coal block cargo, weighing around 28 lbs each, (Patent Fuel blocks), remain scattered around the site. These bear the words "Patent Cardiff" along with a crown. HAPAG crockery has been recovered from the wreck as has her stern dolphin binnacle and builders plate. Additionally one or two brass letters of her name have been found and recovered in the bow area, along with some portholes.
