= SS Sibiria =

History

German Empire
- Name: Herta
- Owner: Kingsin Line
- Builder: Blohm & Voss; Hamburg, Germany
- Yard number: 102
- Launched: 21 April 1894
- Fate: Sold to Hamburg America Line, 1898

History

German Empire
- Name: Sibiria
- Owner: Hamburg America Line
- Acquired: 1898
- Fate: Sold to Atlantic Fruit Company

History

United States
- Owner: Atlantic Fruit Company
- Acquired: 1915
- Fate: Foundered on the Goodwin Sands 20 November 1916

General characteristics
- Type: Passenger/Cargo ship
- Tonnage: 3,535 GRT
- Length: 109 ft (33 m) p/p 552 ft (168 m) o/a
- Beam: 12.8 m (42 ft)
- Depth: 34.9 m (115 ft)
- Installed power: 1700 NHP, 8,000 hp or 6,000 kW
- Propulsion: two 1 x 3-cylinder triple expansion engine, single shaft, 1 screw
- Speed: 11.5 knots (21.3 km/h)

SS Sibiria was a German general cargo ship built in 1894. Originally named Hertha, she was bought by the Hamburg America Line in 1898.

In December 1902, Sibiria was chartered by the German Kaiserliche Marine (Imperial Navy) to serve as a collier in support of the East American Cruiser Division during the Venezuelan crisis of 1902–1903. These operations continued into January 1903.

In May 1915 she was bought by an American company, the Atlantic Fruit Company. She foundered on 20 November 1916 on the Goodwin Sands in the English Channel. This elicited controversy in the British Press, as regards her legal status under the Trading with the Enemy Act 1914.
