= SS Frontier (1922) =

Cargo ship built in 1922

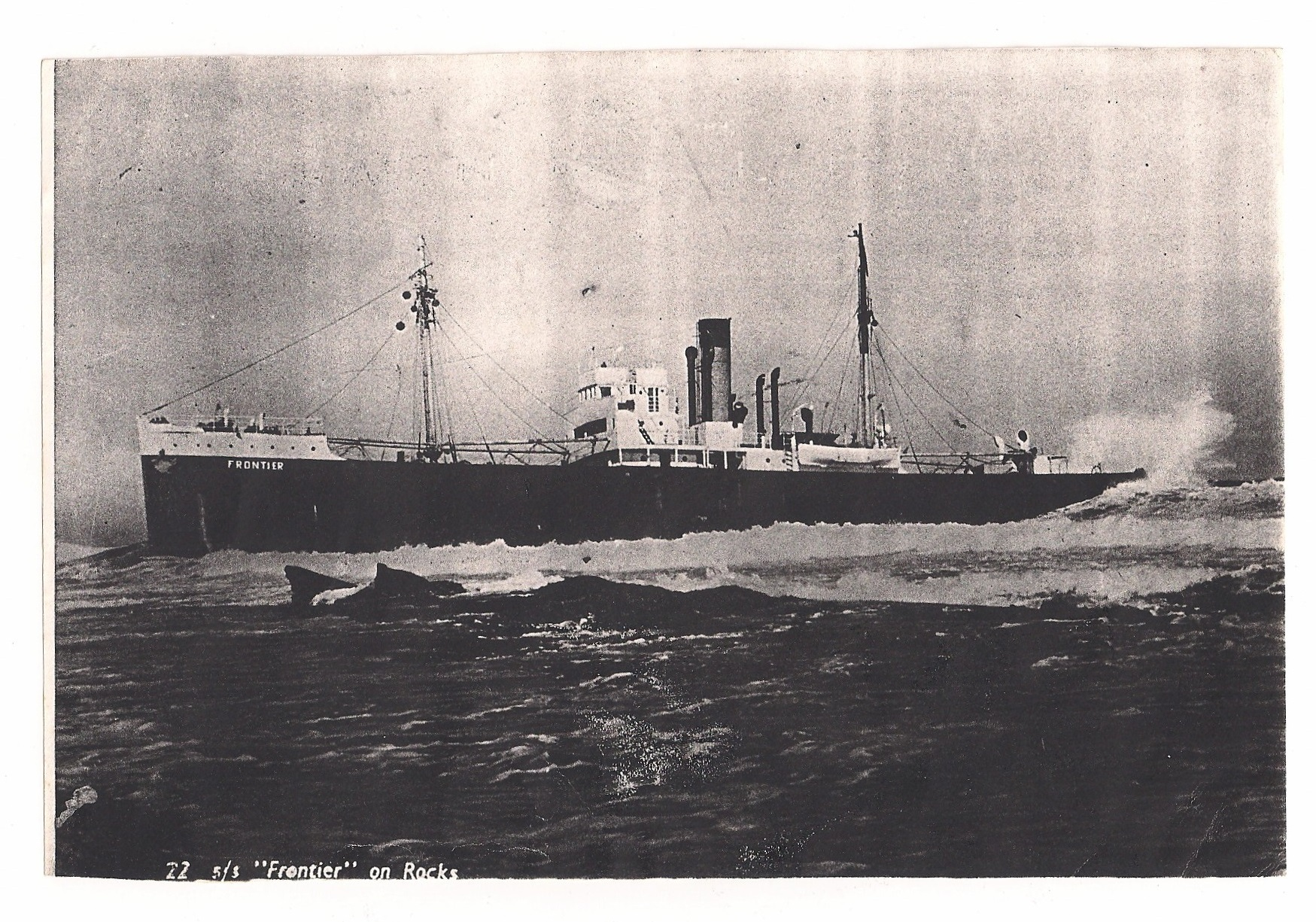
- Frontier on Rocks - 1957, Shipwrecked near Cosy Corner (Ross' Creek) and Ncera Mouth

History
- Name: Cattaro (1922–30); Finkenau (1930–45); Levensau (1945); Empire Convoy (1945–46); Grebberg (1946–47); Echo (1947–53); Frontier (1953–57)
- Owner: Hamburg-Amerikanische Packetfahrt AG (1922–30); Bugsier Reederei & Bergungs AG (1930–45); Ministry of War Transport (1945); Atkinson & Co Ltd (1945–46); Dutch Government (1946–47); Hudig & Veder (1947–52); African Coasters (Pty) Ltd (1952–57)
- Operator: Hamburg-Amerikanische Packetfahrt AG (1922–30); Bugsier Reederei & Bergungs AG (1930–45); Ministry of War Transport (1945); Ministry of Transport (1945–46); Dutch Government (1946–47); Hudig & Veder (1947–52); African Coasters (Pty) Ltd (1952–57)
- Port of registry: (Weimar Republic) Hamburg (1922–30); (Weimar Republic) Bremerhaven (1930–33); (Nazi Germany) Bremerhaven (1933–45); (United Kingdom) London (1945–46); Netherlands (1946–52); (South Africa) Durban (1952–57)
- Builder: Lindenau & Co, Memeler Schiffswerke
- Launched: 1922
- Out of service: 27 September 1952
- Identification: Code Letters RDFQ (1922–34); Code Letters DQOY (1934–45); Code Letter GJBX (1945–46); United Kingdom Official Number 180585 (1945–46)
- Fate: Wrecked

General characteristics
- Type: Cargo ship
- Tonnage: 1,424 GRT (1922–30); 916 GRT (1930–45)1,000 GRT (1945–57); 810 NRT (1922–30); 473 GRT (1930–45); 433 NRT (1945–57); 1,400 DWT (1952–57)
- Length: 227 ft 2 in (69.24 m)
- Beam: 34 ft 3 in (10.44 m)
- Depth: 20 ft 1 in (6.12 m)
- Installed power: Triple expansion steam engine
- Propulsion: Screw propeller

Frontier was a 1,000 GRT cargo ship that was built in 1922 as Cattaro by Memeler Schiffswerke, Lindenau & Co, Memel, Germany. After a sale in 1930 she was renamed Finkenau. In 1945, she was renamed Levensau and was seized later that year by the Allies at Brunsbüttel, passed to the Ministry of War Transport (MoWT) and was renamed Empire Convoy. She was allocated to the Netherlands in 1946 and renamed Grebburg. She was sold into merchant service in 1947 and renamed Echo. A sale to South Africa in 1952 saw her renamed Frontier. The ship served until 1957 when she ran aground and broke up.

== Description ==
Frontier was built in 1922 by Memeler Schiffsbau, Lindenau & Co Memel, Germany. The ship was 227 feet 2 inches (69.24 m) long, with a beam of 34 feet 3 inches (10.44 m) and a depth of 20 feet 1 inch (6.12 m). She was propelled by a triple expansion steam engine, which had cylinders of 15 3/4 inches (40 cm), 26 inches (66 cm) and 43 3/16 inches (109.7 cm) diameter by 27 3/4 inches (70 cm) stroke. The engine was built by Vulcan Werke, Stettin, Germany.

== History ==
The first ship built by Lindenau at the Memeler Schiffswerke, Cattaro was built for the Hamburg Amerikanische Packetfahrt AG, Hamburg. She was allocated the Code Letters RDFQ and was assessed as 1,424 GRT, 810 NRT. In 1930, she was sold to Bugsier Reederei & Bergungs AG, Bremerhaven and was renamed Finkenau. She was assessed as 916 GRT, 473 NRT. In 1934, her Code Letters were changed to DQOY. In May 1940, Finkenau was damaged by a mine in the Baltic Sea.

In 1945, her hame was changed to Levensau. She was seized in May 1945 at Brunsbüttel, passed to the MoWT and renamed Empire Convoy. Her port of registry was changed to London. She was placed under the management of Atkinson & Co Ltd. The Code Letters GJBX and United Kingdom Official Number 180585 were allocated. Empire Convoy was assessed as 1,000 GRT, 433 NRT. In 1946, Empire Convoy was allocated to the Netherlands and was renamed Grebberg.

In 1947, she was sold to Huidig & Veder and was renamed Echo. In 1952, she was sold to African Coasters (Pty) Ltd, Durban, South Africa. In 1953, she was renamed Frontier, the fourth African Coasters ship to bear that name. She was assessed at 1,400 DWT. She served until 27 September 1957 when she ran aground near the mouth of the Ncera River, 23 nautical miles (43 km) east of East London while on a voyage from Durban to Port Elizabeth. On 29 September, she broke up and was declared a total loss.
