= SS Reliance =

German transatlantic liner

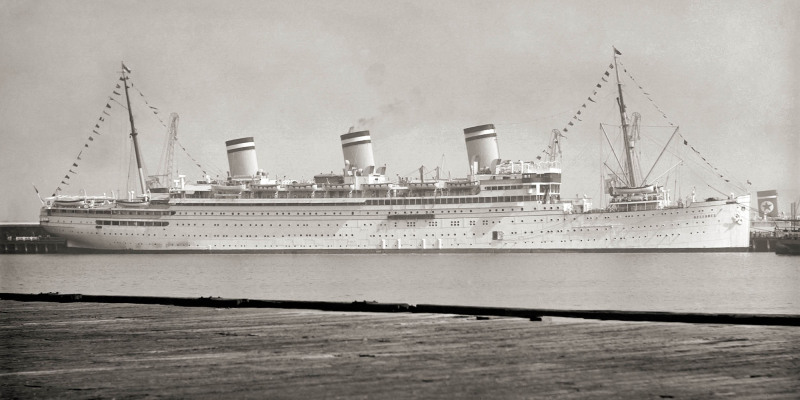
- Reliance in HAPAG service in 1937, with her hull white and new funnels

History
- Name: 1914: Johann Heinrich Burchard; 1920: Limburgia; 1926: Reliance
- Namesake: 1914: Johann Heinrich Burchard; 1920: Limburg
- Owner: 1915: HAPAG; 1916: Kon. Hollandsche Lloyd; 1922: United American Lines; 1926: HAPAG
- Port of registry: 1920: (Netherlands) Amsterdam; 1922: (United States) New York; 1923: Panama City; 1926: (Weimar Republic) Hamburg
- Route: 1920: Amsterdam – Buenos Aires; 1922: Hamburg – New York
- Builder: Joh. C. Tecklenborg, Geestemünde
- Yard number: 256
- Launched: 10 February 1914
- Completed: 20 November 1915
- Maiden voyage: 19 May 1920
- Refit: 1922, 1927, 1937
- Identification: code letters RFVG (1926–33); call sign DHTV (1934–38)
- Fate: Burned 1938, scrapped 1941

General characteristics
- Type: Ocean liner
- Tonnage: 1930: 19,821 GRT, 13,054 NRT; 1937: 19,618 GRT, 9,175 NRT
- Length: 590.4 ft (180.0 m)
- Beam: 80.5 ft (24.5 m)
- Depth: 39.7 ft (12.1 m)
- Decks: 1
- Propulsion: 3 × screws; 2 × triple-expansion engines; 1 × exhaust steam turbine
- Speed: 17 knots (31 km/h)
- Capacity: 1915: 315 1st class, 301 2nd class, 850 3rd class, 850 steerage; 1922: 290 1st class, 320 2nd class, 400 3rd class; 1937: 633 1st class, 186 2nd class
- Sensors & processing systems: by 1930: submarine signalling; wireless direction finding; by 1935: gyrocompass; by 1936: echo sounding device
- Notes: sister ship: Resolute

Reliance was one of a pair of transatlantic steam ocean liners that were launched in 1914 in Germany for the Hamburg America Line (HAPAG), sold to a Dutch shipping line in 1916, and seized by the United States as World War I reparations in 1922. United American Lines (UAL) operated her until 1926, when HAPAG bought her back.

Reliance was launched as Johann Heinrich Burchard. Her Dutch operator renamed her Limburgia. UAL renamed her Reliance. Her sister ship was Resolute.

A fire gutted Reliance in 1938, and her wreck was scrapped in 1941.

== Building ==
Joh. C. Tecklenborg built the ship at Geestemünde in Bremerhaven. Elizabeth Burchard launched her on 10 February 1914, naming her after her father Johann Heinrich Burchard (1852–1912), a former Mayor of Hamburg. AG Weser built her sister ship in Bremen, launching her as William O'Swald on 30 March 1914.

Johann Heinrich Burchard was completed and delivered to HAPAG on 20 November 1915. Because of the First World War, HAPAG immediately laid her up.

JH Burchard had three funnels and two masts. Her registered length was 590.4 ft (180.0 m), her beam was 80.5 ft (24.5 m) and her depth was 39.7 ft (12.1 m). As built, she had capacity for 2,316 passengers: 315 first class, 301 second class, 850 third class and 850 steerage.

JH Burchard had three screws. A pair of four-cylinder triple-expansion steam engines drove her port and starboard screws. Exhaust steam from their low-pressure cylinders powered a low-pressure steam turbine that drove her middle screw. Between them the three engines gave her a speed of 17 knots (31 km/h)

== KHL service ==
In the First World War the Imperial German Navy sank numerous neutral ships in error, including two Dutch passenger liners. A German mine sank Holland America Line's Rijndam on 18 January 1916, and a u-boat sank Koninklijke Hollandsche Lloyd's Tubantia by torpedo on 16 March 1916.

Tubantia's sinking caused an international outcry, so The German government persuaded HAPAG to sell JH Burchard to KHL to replace her. The sale was completed on 8 June 1916, but delivery was deferred until after the end of the war.

The German Navy also sank a number of Koninklijke Rotterdamsche Lloyd (KRL) cargo ships: Palembang and Kediri in 1916 and Bandoeng and Jacatra in 1917. HAPAG sold William O'Swald to KRL, with the delivery deferred until after the war like her sister ship.

KHL renamed JH Burchard as Limburgia, and KRL renamed William O'Swald as Brabantia, after two of the provinces of the Netherlands. But after the Armistice of 11 November 1918, the Allies claimed both ships as reparations. AG Weser had yet to complete Brabantia, but Limburgia was ready to be delivered. KHL put a Dutch crew on Limburgia, commanded by a German captain from JC Tecklenborg, to take her to the Netherlands. The Royal Navy stationed a destroyer off the mouth of the Weser to prevent her from leaving in Dutch hands.

On 3 February 1920 Limburgia left Bremerhaven in defiance of the Royal Navy. The destroyer failed to act, and Limburgia reached Amsterdam. On 19 May 1920 she began her maiden voyage, sailing from Amsterdam to Buenos Aires in Argentina. Brabantia followed, leaving Bremen on 28 July 1920 and beginning her maiden voyage on 1 September. At the time, the two ships were the largest on the route between Europe and the River Plate.

== UAL service ==
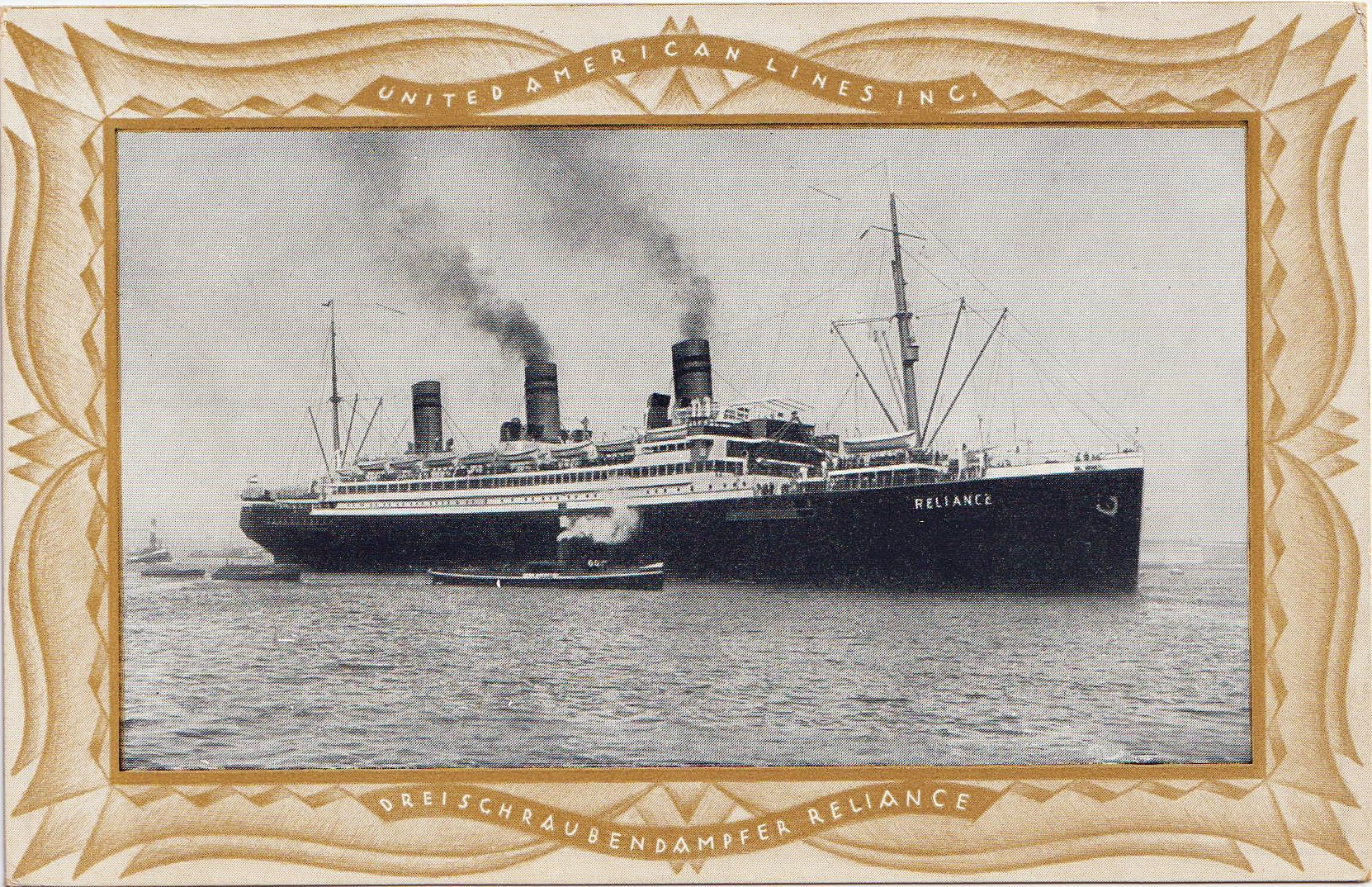
Reliance in United American Lines livery, with her original funnels

One source states that the Allied Reparations Committee awarded Limburgia and Brabantia to the United States. Another states that W. Averell Harriman's United American Lines (UAL) bought the two ships from KHL and KRL.

Either way, KHL and KRL handed Limburgia and Brabantia to UAL on 4 January 1922. UAL renamed Limburgia as Reliance, had Blohm & Voss in Hamburg refit her as a three-class ship. Her passenger capacity was reduced to 1,010 berths: 290 first class, 320 second class and 400 third class.

On 3 May 1922 UAL put Reliance into scheduled service between Hamburg and New York. Initially UAL registered Reliance in the US, but in 1923 she was re-registered in Panama to circumvent prohibition in the United States.

== HAPAG service ==
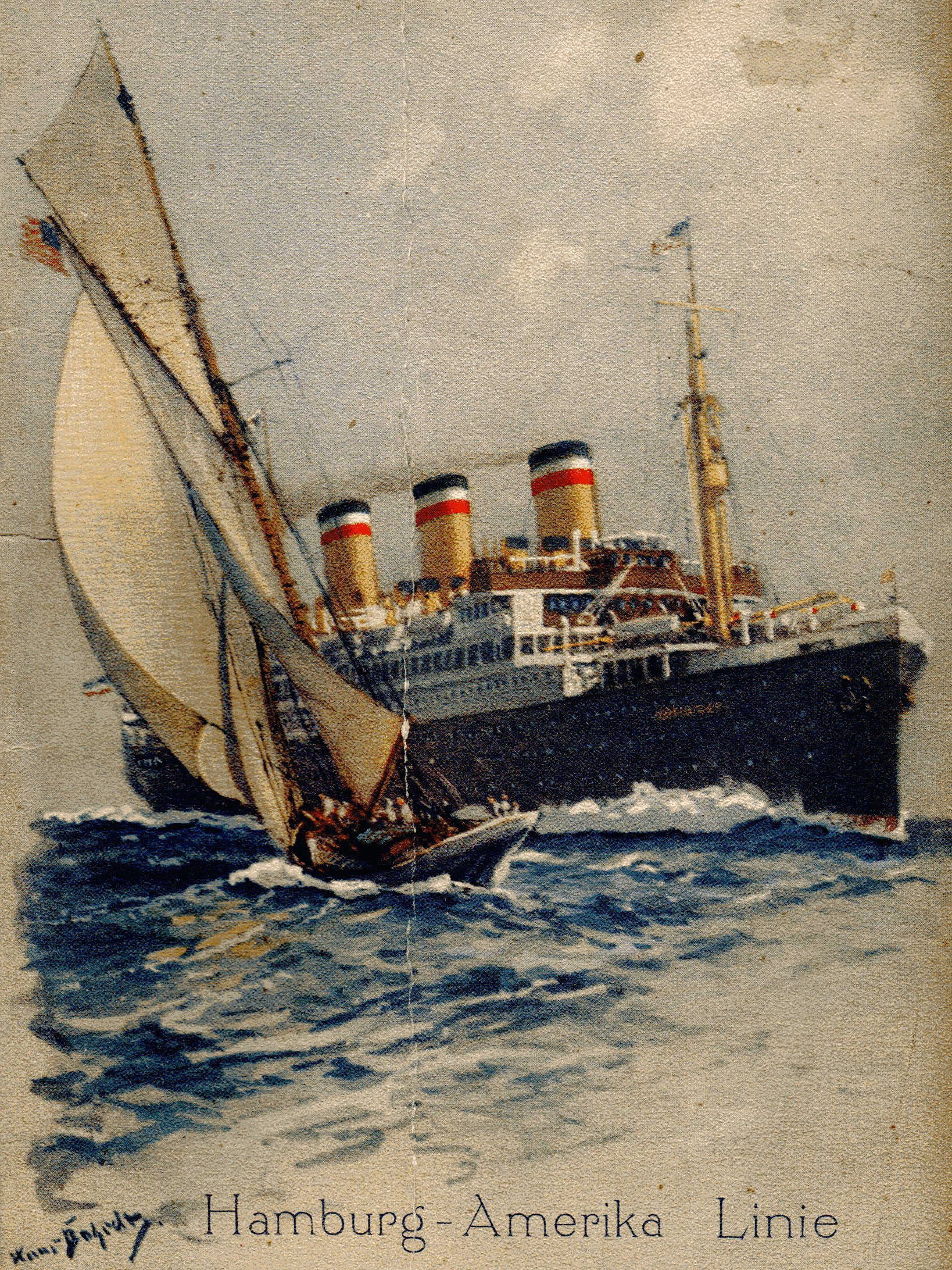
1929 HAPAG dinner menu from Reliance

UAL had a business relationship with HAPAG. On 27 July 1926 UAL sold Reliance to HAPAG, and on 24 August she made her first Hamburg – New York voyage under HAPAG ownership. In 1927 Blohm & Voss refitted her again, and on 3 July she began her first cruise. From 1928 HAPAG employed her entirely on cruising, and either she or Resolute made a World cruise each winter.

By 1930 Reliance's tonnages were 19,821 GRT and 13,054 NRT. Reliance's German code letters were RFVG until 1933–34, when they were superseded by the call sign DHTV.

In December 1934 Reliance's first class berths were increased to 497, and her hull was repainted white to suit her cruising role. Her navigation equipment included a gyrocompass by 1935 and an echo sounding device by 1936.

Between September and November 1937 Blohm & Voss refitted her again, making her a two-class ship. Blohm & Voss reduced her passenger capacity again to 819 berths: 633 first class and 186 second class. To modernise her appearance Blohm & Voss replaced her funnels with larger ones. The refit reduced her tonnages to 19,618 GRT and 9,175 NRT.

On 7 August 1938 Reliance was badly damaged by fire, suspected to be arson. She was declared total loss, and HAPAG handed her to her insurers. On 4 January 1940 Krupp bought her for scrap, and in 1941 she was broken up in Bremerhaven.

== Bibliography ==
- Harnack, Edwin P (1930) [1903]. All About Ships & Shipping (3rd ed.). London: Faber and Faber.
- Wilson, RM (1956). The Big Ships. London: Cassell & Co.
