= SS Andrios =

Cargo ship

History
- Name: Liddesdale (1901); Arabia (1901-1923); Caterham (1923); Andrios (1923-1926)
- Owner: Mackil R. & Co. (1901); Hamburg America Line (1901-1919); British Shipping Controller (1919-1920); Belgian Government (1920-1923); Harrison H. (Shipping) Ltd. (1923); Goulandris Brothers (1923-1926)
- Operator: Owner operated except: Haldin & Co (1919); Association Maritime Belge (1920-1922); Ch. De Cort & Verschueren (1922-1923)
- Port of registry: London, United Kingdom
- Builder: Napier & Miller Yoker, Glasgow
- Yard number: 117
- Launched: 16 April 1901
- Fate: Wrecked on 20 November 1926

General characteristics
- Type: Cargo ship
- Tonnage: 4,438 GRT
- Length: 385 ft 4 in (117.45 m)
- Beam: 49 ft 1 in (14.96 m)
- Propulsion: Steam triple expansion engine; 415 n.h.p.
- Speed: 10 kn (12 mph; 19 km/h)

SS Andrios was a cargo ship which sailed for a number of owners under several names before sinking off the Berlengas Islands, near the coast of Portugal, in 1926.

She was initially ordered by Robert Mackill, Glasgow from the yards of Napier & Miller Yoker and was launched on 16 April 1901 as Liddlesdale but was purchased before completion by the Hamburg-America Line and renamed Arabia. She sailed during the First World War and in 1919 was acquired by the Shipping Controller, and managed on their behalf by the London-based company Haldin & Co. She continued as Arabia under their ownership, and in 1920 was sold to the Belgian Government and managed by Association Maritime Belge, of Antwerp. Arabia was bought in 1922 by Ch. De Cort & Verschueren, and left Belgian ownership in 1923 when she was bought by the British firm by H Harrison (Shipping) Ltd. They renamed her Caterham, but sold her later that year to Goulandris Brothers, a Greek company but based in London. They renamed her Andrios, under which name she sailed for the remainder of her career.

Andrios was wrecked on 20 November 1926, while sailing from Novorossiysk to Falmouth with a cargo of wheat. She ran aground off the Berlengas Islands, her wreck lying in 27 metres of water.
