= USS Black Arrow =

1919 Troop transport

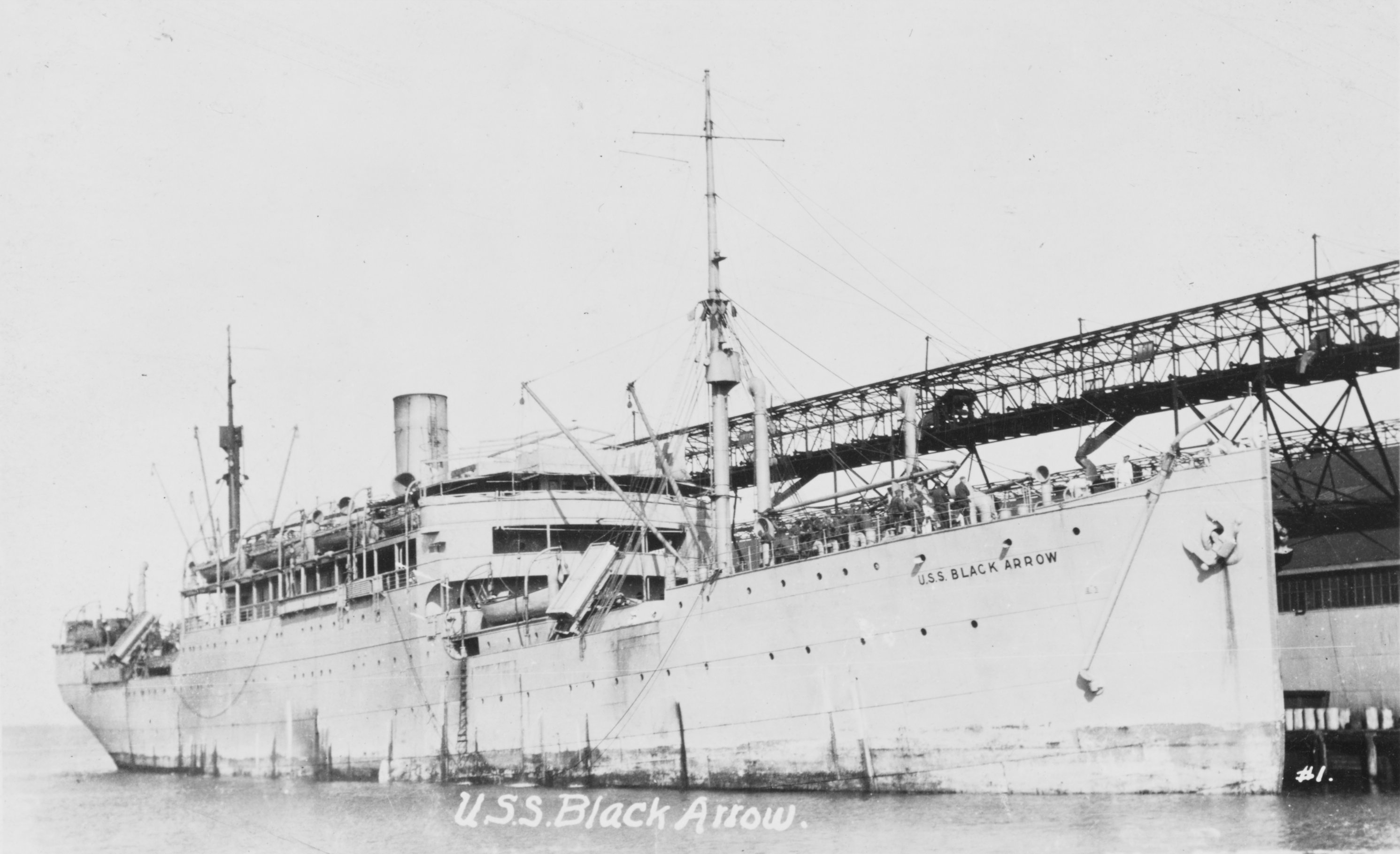
- USS Black Arrow in port, 1919

History
- Name: USS Black Arrow
- Owner: Hamburg America Line (1904–17); United States Shipping Board (1917–24?)
- Operator: Hamburg America Line (1904–14); United States Army (1917–19); United States Navy (Mar–Aug 1919); American Line (1919–20); Ward Line (1920–21)
- Builder: Bremer Vulcan (Vegesack, Germany)
- Yard number: 476
- Launched: 5 Nov 1904
- Christened: Rhaetia
- Completed: 5 May 1905
- Commissioned: (USN): 27 Jan–9 Aug 1919
- Maiden voyage: 27 May 1905
- In service: 1905–14; 1917–21
- Out of service: 1914–17; 1921–24
- Renamed: USAT Black Hawk (1917); USAT Black Arrow (unknown date); USS Black Arrow (ID-1534) (1919); Black Arrow (1919)
- Stricken: 9 Aug 1919
- Fate: Scrapped at Kearny and Howland Hook, New Jersey, late 1924

General characteristics
- Type: Passenger-cargo (1905–17)
- Tonnage: 7,050 DWT (long tons); 6,600 GRT; 4,141 NRT
- Length: 408 ft 4 in (124.5 m)
- Beam: 52 ft 7 in (16.0 m)
- Draft: 25 ft 10 in (7.87 m)
- Depth of hold: 28 ft (8.5 m)
- Installed power: 1 × 3,200 ihp (2,400 kW) quadruple expansion; 4 × 215 psi (1,480 kPa) Scotch boilers, coal-fired
- Propulsion: Single screw
- Speed: 13 knots (15 mph; 24 km/h)
- Capacity: 100 first-class, 800 steerage

General characteristics
- Type: Troop transport (Mar–Aug 1919)
- Troops: 85 officers, 1510 enlisted
- Complement: 21 officers, 96 enlisted
- Notes: Other characteristics similar or identical to those listed for passenger-cargo (1905–17) above

General characteristics
- Type: Passenger-cargo (1920–22)
- Capacity: 80 first-class, 560 steerage
- Notes: Other characteristics similar or identical to those listed for passenger-cargo (1905–17) above

USS Black Arrow (ID-1534) was a troop transport commissioned in 1919 to assist in the post-World War I repatriation of U.S. troops from France. Black Arrow was originally SS Rhaetia, a passenger-cargo ship built in Germany in 1904–05 for the Hamburg-America Line. From 1905 to 1914, Rhaetia operated primarily between Hamburg, Germany and South America, though she was also intermittently employed as an immigrant ship to the United States. With the outbreak of World War I in August 1914, Rhaetia was interned in Philadelphia.

With the entry of the United States into the war in April 1917, Rhaetia and other German ships interned in U.S. ports were seized by the U.S. government for possible use in the war effort. After repairs, the former Rhaetia went into service with the U.S. Army as a general transport under the names USAT Black Hawk and later USAT Black Arrow, making five round trips between the United States and France from June 1917 to the end of the war in November. The ship was then converted into a troop transport in order to assist with the repatriation of U.S. troops from France. Commissioned into the U.S. Navy as USS Black Arrow (ID-1534), the ship subsequently made three round trips to France from April to July 1919, returning a total of 4,759 troops to the United States, before decommissioning in August.

Reverting to the name SS Black Arrow following her naval decommission, the vessel was given a refit before being chartered by the United States Shipping Board to the American Line. She then recommenced merchant service as a passenger-cargo ship, inaugurating a new service from New York to Black Sea and Near East ports, and in December 1919 became the first ship to return to the United States from Constantinople since the outbreak of the war. After only one more voyage to the Near East however, the ship was given another refit and chartered to the Ward Line for service between New York and Spain.

In August 1921, on her fourth voyage to Spain, Black Arrow ran aground off the Spanish coast at Cape Vilan. Refloated, she was returned to New York in November but saw no further service. After being laid up for an extended period, she was scrapped at New Jersey in late 1924.

== Construction and design ==
Rhaetia—a steel-hulled, screw-propelled passenger-cargo ship and the sister ship of Rugia—was built in 1904–05 by Bremer Vulcan of Vegesack, Germany, for the South American service of the Hamburg-America Line. Her yard number was 476. She was launched 5 November 1904 and completed 5 May 1905.

Rhaetia had a length of 408 feet 4 inches (124.46 m), beam of 52 feet 7 inches (16.03 m), hold depth of 28 feet (8.5 m) and draft of about 25 feet (7.6 m). She had a gross register tonnage of 6,600, net register tonnage of 4,141, deadweight tonnage of 7,050 long tons and (as measured in later U.S. Navy service) displacement of 11,900 long tons. She was fitted with accommodation for 100 first-class and 800 third-class (steerage) passengers, which included "all modern appliances for lighting, heating and refrigeration." (Note: This source gives a slightly larger passenger capacity than that given in Bonsor.) Her original cargo capacity is not known, but in later American service it was listed as 330,330 cubic feet bale or 356,229 cu grain. The vessel had two masts, a single smokestack; one deck not including the shelter deck; nine waterproof bulkheads, and water ballast tanks with a total capacity of 1,144 tons.

Rhaetia was powered by a 3200 ihp four-cylinder quadruple expansion steam engine with cylinders of 24, 35, 51 and 72 inches (61, 89, 130 and 183 cm) by 54-inch (140 cm) stroke, driving a single screw propeller. Steam was supplied by four single-ended, coal-fired Scotch boilers with a working pressure of 215 psi (1,480 kPa). With a coal bunker capacity of 1,590 tons and average coal consumption of 46 tons per day, the ship had a steaming radius of 8,784 nautical miles (16,268 km; 10,108 mi). Rhaetia had a service speed of 13 knots (15 mph; 24 km/h). (Note: Note that most ship dimensions will vary slightly from source to source.)

== Service history ==
=== Hamburg–America Line, 1905–17 ===
Though built for service between Hamburg, Germany and South America, Rhaetia made her maiden voyage to New York due to a then-prevailing heavy demand for immigrant ships, clearing Hamburg 27 May 1905 and arriving 10 June. She departed on the return journey to Hamburg, via Plymouth, England, and Cherbourg, France, on 17 June, her berths filled with American vacationers to the continent. A second immigrant voyage was then made, clearing Hamburg 8 July and returning 10 August. After this, the ship apparently transferred to her planned Hamburg to South American service. In late 1905, Rhaetia, her sister ship Rugia and two other ships of the Hamburg-America Line, Arcadia and Andalusia, were chartered by the Imperial Russian government to embark Russian troops—probably ex-prisoners of war captured during the recently concluded Russo-Japanese War—at Nagasaki, Japan, the four ships clearing that port 19 December for Vladivostok. Rhaetia then resumed her South American service, where she would remain for several years.

In 1909, Rhaetia briefly returned to United States service, making two round trips between Hamburg and Philadelphia from 24 March to 22 June; the first of these trips, on the outbound leg from Hamburg, was made via New York. The vessel then returned to South American service, and is known to have made voyages to Brazil in 1910 and 1911.

In 1914, Rhaetia was returned to service between Hamburg and the United States for a third and final time, this time with an initial destination port of Boston. The return leg of these voyages was originally to be made via Queenstown, Ireland and Boulogne, France, but at the last moment the British port of call was changed to Plymouth, England, disappointing Queenstown's city fathers who had planned a civic reception for the ship. A total of three round trips between Hamburg and Boston were eventually made by Rhaetia, (Note: The second voyage arrived at Boston 13 March and returned to Hamburg on the 31st. See text for the other two voyages.) the first departing Hamburg 17 January and the last clearing Boston 9 May. On the first of these round trips, Rhaetia arrived at Boston with 11 cabin and 119 steerage passengers—a typically small passenger list for a winter voyage. She departed 5 February with five cabin and 34 steerage passengers—of whom half the latter were rejected immigrants—and cargoes which included "3000 boxes of scythe stones for the Russian farming district, flour, asbestos, 20 carloads agricultural machinery, and general merchandise."

Rhaetia was then switched to the Philadelphia route, departing Hamburg 7 July and arriving at Philadelphia on the 22nd. The vessel was due to leave on the return journey to Hamburg 1 August with 50 cabin and 150 steerage passengers and a "large general cargo", but on the same day, Germany entered World War I by declaring war on Russia, and the Hamburg–America Line suspended its services indefinitely. Rhaetia's stranded cabin-class passengers were given the choice of either receiving a full refund or transferring to the neutral American steamer Merion, leaving the same day, with many taking the latter option.

Rhaetia was subsequently interned at Philadelphia, guarded by a round-the-clock police watch. In late August, negotiations between the U.S. government and the German consulate raised the possibility of the sale or transfer to U.S. registry of the ship, but neither eventuated. In March 1915, W. R. Grace & Co. made an offer of $2,000,000 for the purchase of both Rhaetia and her stablemate Prinz Oskar, also in internment at Philadelphia, but this proposal too was unsuccessful and the two ships were to remain in internment until America's entry into the war in April 1917. During the internment period, many members of the two ships' crews applied for United States citizenship, with about 60 having their applications accepted.

=== Seizure and U.S. Army service, 1917–1919 ===
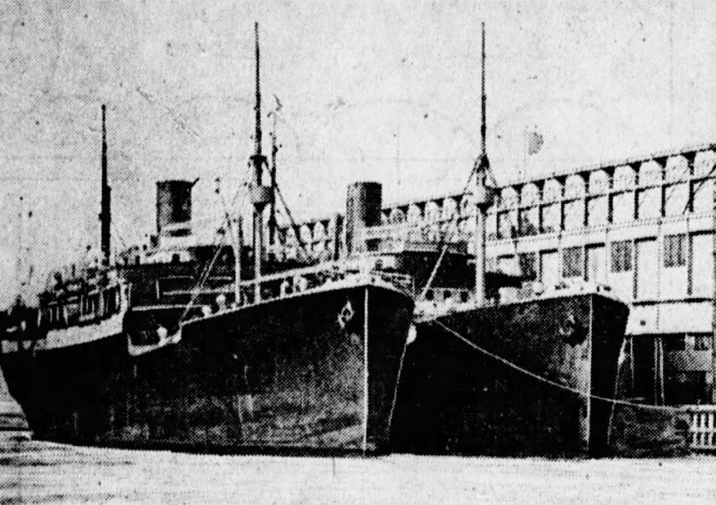
Rhaetia (left) and Prinz Oskar in internment at Philadelphia

On 1 February 1917, Germany resumed unrestricted submarine warfare, in response to which, the United States broke diplomatic relations on the 3rd. On the latter date, acting on instructions from Washington, Philadelphia's port authorities confined the crews of German ships interned in the port, including the crew of Rhaetia, to their vessels, while strengthening the guard over the ships.

On 6 April, the U.S. House of Representatives passed a joint resolution declaring the United States to be in a state of war with Germany. A little over 2 1/2 hours later, at 5:30 am, customs and immigration officials, accompanied by a contingent of 41 US Marines, gathered at the Christian Street dock (Note: Specifically, Pier 40, South Wharves.) where Rhaetia and Prinz Oskar were berthed, to seize the ships on behalf of the United States Shipping Board and take their crews into custody. The operation began about 5:40 am, waking the crews in the process, with each crew member permitted to gather his belongings under the watchful eye of an armed marine. While no resistance was encountered, it was discovered during the operation that five of the 41 crewmen were missing, having apparently deserted their ships. The remaining 36 crew were taken to the Gloucester immigration station to be detained pending determination of their status; three of the missing sailors were located a few days later and similarly detained. Rhaetia's crew and those of several other interned German ships were eventually relocated from Gloucester to a prison camp facility in Hot Springs, North Carolina.

After the seizure of Rhaetia and Prinz Oskar, customs officials quickly discovered that their crews had sabotaged the ships' engines to prevent or delay their possible utilization in the U.S. war effort. In Prinz Oskar's case, the order to sabotage had reportedly been relayed from the chief engineer of the Hamburg America Line when the U.S. had broken diplomatic relations with Germany on 3 February; in Rhaetia's case however, her commander testified that he had ordered the sabotage on his own cognizance prior to that date. After temporary repairs at the Christian Street dock, both ships were towed to the shipyard of William Cramp & Sons for more comprehensive repairs.

While repairs were initially estimated to take about six months, work on the two vessels was completed much more quickly than anticipated, and by June Rhaetia was back in service as a U.S. Army transport under the name USAT Black Hawk. During the war, the ship embarked on five round trips between New York and various French and other European ports on the Army's behalf. In August 1917, on a voyage to Italy, the ship was reportedly attacked by submarine, albeit unsuccessfully, in the Mediterranean. On an unknown date during her Army service, Black Hawk was renamed USAT Black Arrow. On her fifth and final voyage for the Army, Black Arrow returned to New York from Gibraltar on 19 December 1918 with eight officers and 115 enlisted men; on arrival, the ship's officers described how they had witnessed the sinking of HMS Britannia, torpedoed 9 November in the Mediterranean—one of the last ships sunk by enemy action in the war.

=== U.S. Navy troop transport, 1919 ===
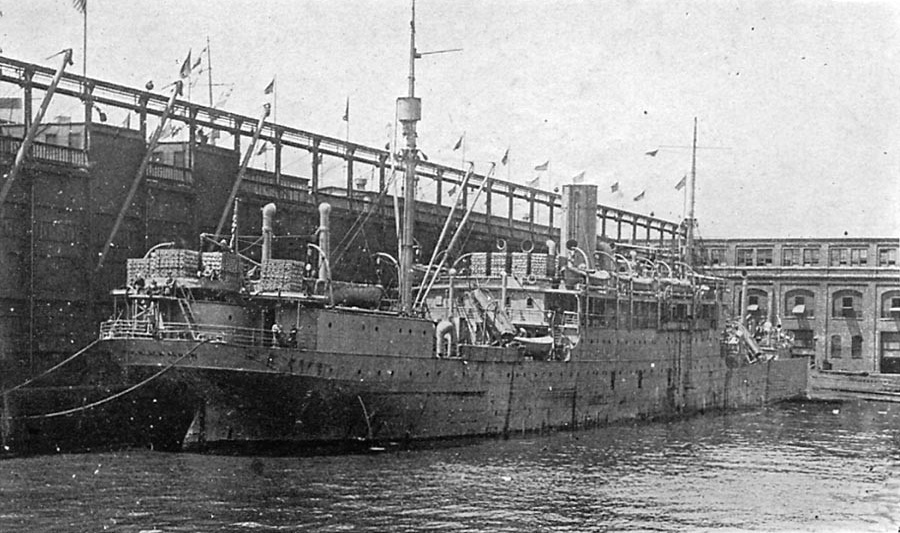
Stern view of USS Black Arrow in port in 1919, probably in New York Harbor

With the war over, the British contingent of the American Cruiser and Transport Force withdrew, leaving the United States with insufficient tonnage needed to quickly repatriate U.S. troops from Europe. To rectify the problem, a total of 56 ships under the control of the U.S. government, including Black Arrow, were selected for conversion into troop transports.

Black Arrow was converted by the Morse Dry Dock and Repair Company of Brooklyn between 17 January and 15 March 1919, at a cost of $170,938 (Note: The source has erroneously transcribed the company name as "Morse Dry Dock & Railway Co.".)—in the process becoming the first ship raised by the Morse Company's new floating dock, the largest of its type in the world. While still undergoing conversion, the ship was commissioned into the U.S. Navy on 27 January as USS Black Arrow (ID-1534). After conversion, the ship had a passenger capacity of 85 officers and 1,510 enlisted men, and a crew complement of 21 officers and 96 enlisted men,

Black Arrow subsequently made three round trips between the United States and France to repatriate troops. On the first of these, the ship departed New York for Brest, France on or about 6 April, making the return voyage between 26 April and 6 May, carrying artillery units of 82nd Division and a variety of other troops including a heavy mobile ordnance repair shop, the 34th evacuation hospital and casual units—1,585 men in total. Departing New York 13 May, Black Arrow returned to Brest, then continued on to Bordeaux before clearing that port on the 31st for Newport News, Virginia, where on 13 June she arrived to disembark eight casual and two transportation companies, a bakery company, the 20th evacuation hospital and several sanitary squads. Black Arrow's third and final repatriation voyage departed Bordeaux 7 July, arriving at New York on or about the 20th with nine motor companies, (Note: Specifically, the 447th, 521st, 522d, 523d, 525th, 606th, 611th, 651st and 695th.) the 713th service park company, 53d guards company, ten casual companies and miscellaneous troops. Altogether, Black Arrow returned a total of 4,759 troops to the United States on her three troop repatriation voyages, including 25 sick or wounded.

With her naval service complete, Black Arrow was decommissioned at Norfolk, Virginia, on 9 August 1919—thus reverting to the name SS Black Arrow—struck from the Naval Vessel Register the same day, and returned to the control of the United States Shipping Board.

=== American Line, 1919–20 ===
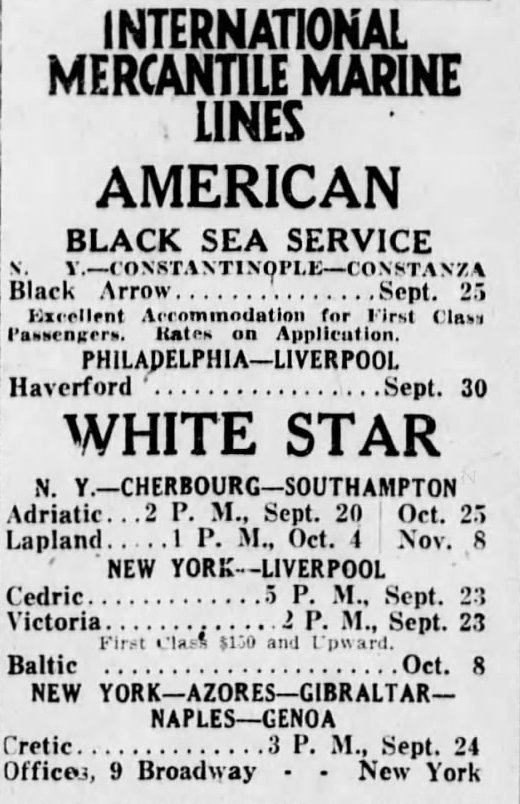
Advertisement for Black Arrow's first voyage to the Near East with the American Line, September 1919.

After decommissioning from the Navy on 9 August, Black Arrow proceeded to New York on the 15th, where passenger accommodations were refitted and "various minor hull and machinery repairs" completed. She was then chartered by the USSB to the American Line, a subsidiary of International Mercantile Marine, to inaugurate a new service to Near East and Black Sea ports including Constanța, Romania, and Constantinople, Turkey.

Black Arrow's initial voyage to the Near East was originally scheduled for departure from New York on 15 September, but was rescheduled for the 25th. On the 23rd, a rumor circulated that the ship was being loaded with munitions bound for General Anton Denikin's White Army, then engaged in warfare with Bolshevik forces in Russia. The U.S. State Department denied knowledge of any such shipment, while officials of both the American Line and the USSB declined to comment; however, the arms shipment to Denikin was later apparently confirmed, with the destination port given as Novorossiysk.

Black Arrow departed New York for Constantinople and other ports on 25 September, returning via Smyrna 28 December, in the process becoming the first ship to return to the United States from Constantinople since the outbreak of World War I. The ship returned with 103 passengers including American relief workers who had been stationed in Anatolia, some of whom were willing to speak of their experiences in the region, in particular, the plight of Armenians still living there who had survived the recent genocide. One of the relief workers, a chaplain in the U.S. Army Reserve, described how the relief commission had set up a marriage bureau in Broussa to assist Armenian girls, rescued from harems (Note: "Harem" in the given context is probably a euphemism for "brothel" or similar situation of sexual exploitation.) since the war's end, to find husbands willing to take them; according to the chaplain, the bureau was proving quite successful. Another of Black Arrow's passengers was an Armenian woman of letters who, after surviving many horrors, had been spared the harem experience by a compassionate Ottoman official who found her a position as a servant in his household. Black Arrow's cargoes on this voyage included a gift of a bronze book "from the people of Bulgaria" to Mrs. Andrew Carnegie in appreciation of her late husband's philanthropy.

On 2 January, the USSB offered a number of ex-German ships in its possession for sale, including Black Arrow, on condition that they be employed on routes set by the Board. An offer of $700,000 was eventually made by the Oriental Navigation Company, but the sale did not eventuate. In the meantime, Black Arrow embarked on a second voyage to the Near East, with ports of call including Constantinople, Smyrna, Varna, Bulgaria, and Constanța. Departing New York on the 21st, the ship returned via Gibraltar and Madeira, Spain, clearing the latter port 21 March and arriving at New York 2 April. Her passengers on the return trip included the captain and 39 crew of the ship Natenna, an American wooden-hulled freighter built during the war which had been lost off Casablanca, Morocco, on 8 March. Black Arrow's return cargoes included $119,000 of antique and new Persian rugs—reportedly the first such shipment to the United States since the end of the war—which were later offered at retail prices ranging from $59 to $2,250.

=== Ward Line, 1920–21 ===
On 7 May 1920, a few weeks after Black Arrow's return from her second voyage to the Near East, the ship was allocated by the USSB to a new managing operator, the New York and Cuba Mail Steamship Company, better known as the Ward Line, for service between New York and Spain. On 11 May, she departed New York for Boston to undergo a $400,000 recondition and refit at the Boston Navy Yard. The ship's passenger accommodations at this time were rebuilt to accommodate 80 first-class and 560 steerage class passengers, which work included the installation of three new multi-room suites, the addition of subdivided compartments for families, and the renovation and refit of steerage quarters and redecoration of the entire ship. Reconditioning work on the vessel's machinery included the installation of new boilers, furnaces, feed pump, heater generators and an independent emergency generator.

While work on Black Arrow proceeded, the USSB again advertised the vessel for sale. Four bids were submitted, and when opened 30 September, the highest was found to be from the Polish American Navigation Corporation with an offer of $1,150,000. The USSB deferred on this offer, choosing instead to re-advertise the vessel for sale along with another ex-German ship, SS Orion (originally the Prinz Oskar, Black Arrow's former HAPAG stablemate). Two bids were received by the closing date of 25 October and opened the same day, with the Polish-American Navigation Corp. again proving to be the highest bidder for Black Arrow with a slightly increased offer of $1,175,000. The second offer, a bid of $1,750,000 for both ships, was later withdrawn.

On 10 November, the USSB rejected the Polish-American Corp's offer, reverting instead to its original plan to charter the vessel to the Ward Line. In early December, the ship proceeded to New York to begin service with her new operator, but on the 6th, her steering gear became disabled in the Ambrose Channel and she was towed into port by tugboat.

Black Arrow would subsequently make four round trip voyages between New York and Spain for the Ward Line. The outgoing leg of these voyages was usually made via Havana, Cuba, while the ship's regular Spanish ports of call included Vigo, A Coruña, Gijón, Santander and Bilbao.

On the first of these voyages, Black Arrow departed New York 18 December 1920, returning 5 February 1921 with 47 passengers, but on the return trip her steering gear broke down once again and she was towed into port at New York by harbor tugs. On her second such voyage, the steamer cleared New York 11 February for Vigo via Havana, returning to New York 7 April, her passengers on the homeward leg including three shipwrecked American sailors—rescued by the Dutch ship Zeelandia some days earlier—and 75 Spanish steerage-class passengers. On 23 April, Black Arrow departed New York on her third trip to Spain, but first made a diversion to Tampico, Mexico, where on 22 May she disembarked 445 Chinese steerage-class passengers who had travelled to New York from Hong Kong via the United States' Pacific Coast. The Chinese—a mixture of merchants, laundrymen, market gardeners, cooks and laborers mostly bound for Mexican oil fields—received a hostile reception at Tampico, where they were stoned by Mexican dockside workers.

After returning from A Coruña on 25 June, Black Arrow departed on her fourth and final voyage to Spain on 12 July. On 9 August, a few days after calling at Las Palmas, Canary Islands, the steamer went aground at Cape Vilan, Spain. (Note: The source states that the steamer cleared Las Palmas 5 July but this is plainly an error as the steamer's voyage did not even begin until the 12th. In all likelihood the writer erroneously substituted July for August.) The passengers were safely disembarked, but the steamer sank on the 11th and ship and cargo were reported to be a total loss. However, salvage attempts began shortly thereafter, with Black Arrow's crew remaining aboard to assist (Note: The source erroneously gives the date of the grounding as 11 July.) and the Spanish naval ship Dorado standing by. On 1 September, the ship was successfully refloated, after which she was towed to A Coruña and later, by the wrecking tug Warbler, to Bilbao On 3 November, Black Arrow cleared Bilbao for New York, arriving at her destination on the 17th.

== Later history ==
In early January 1922, a few weeks after Black Arrow's return to New York, the vessel was offered for sale by the USSB, "as is, where is". Later, she was laid up in the Passaic River, New Jersey, for an extended period.

By 1924, Black Arrow and several other ex-USSB ships had been acquired by H. L. Crawford & Co. for the purpose of testing a new ship-breaking method which the firm's proprietor, H. L. Crawford, hoped would prove competitive with foreign yards. Crawford founded a new $75,000 firm, the American Ship Breaking Company, and established a shipbreaking plant at Howland Hook, New Jersey. In September 1924, Black Arrow had her machinery removed on Crawford's behalf at the Shupe Terminal Company, Kearny, New Jersey, after which the ship was to be taken to the Howland Hook plant for dismantling of the hull.
