= SS Austria =

German passenger liner

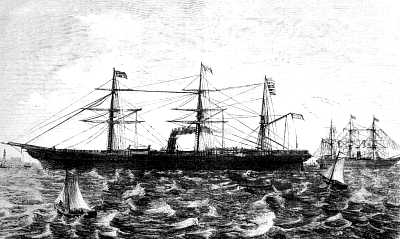
- SS Austria, 1857

History

Hamburg
- Name: SS Austria
- Operator: Hamburg America Line
- Builder: Caird & Company, Greenock, Scotland
- Launched: 23 June 1857
- Fate: Sank, 13 September 1858

General characteristics
- Type: Steamship
- Tonnage: 2,386 GRT; 1,622 NRT
- Length: 320 ft (98 m)
- Beam: 40 ft (12 m)
- Depth: 17 ft 6 in (5.33 m)
- Propulsion: 1 × 400 nhp 2-cylinder steam engine, 1 screw

SS Austria was a steamship of the Hamburg America Line which sank on 13 September 1858, in one of the worst transatlantic maritime disasters of the nineteenth century, claiming the lives of 449 passengers and crew. The Austria was built by Caird & Co. of Greenock, Scotland, and was launched on 23 June 1857. She was 318 ft and 2,684 BRT, with three masts and single screw propeller propulsion.

After a cancelled British Government charter, she went into service with the Hamburg America Line on 1 May 1858 on the Hamburg-New York City route.

== Tragedy at sea ==
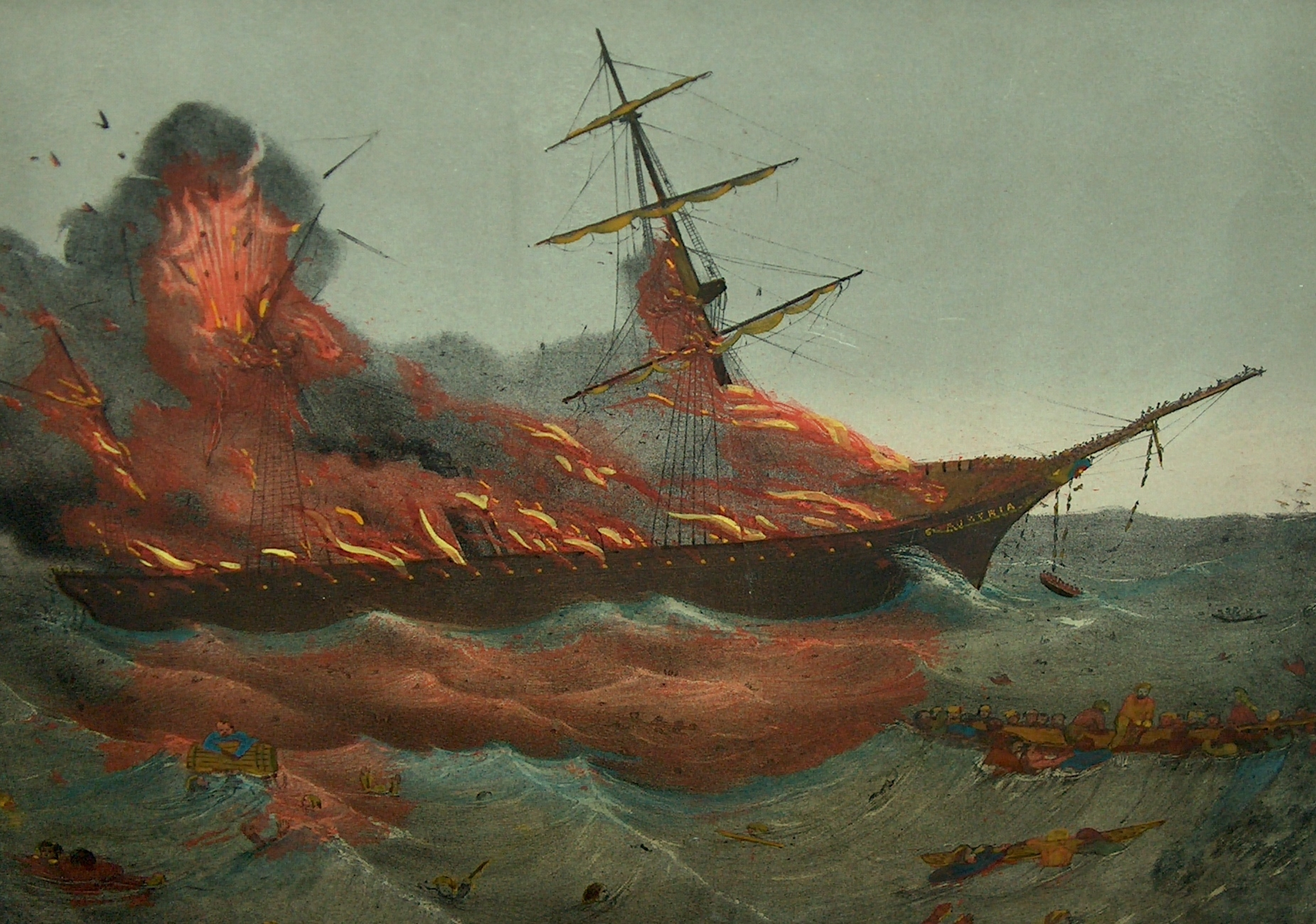
"The shipwreck of SS Austria" shown at Odense, Denmark

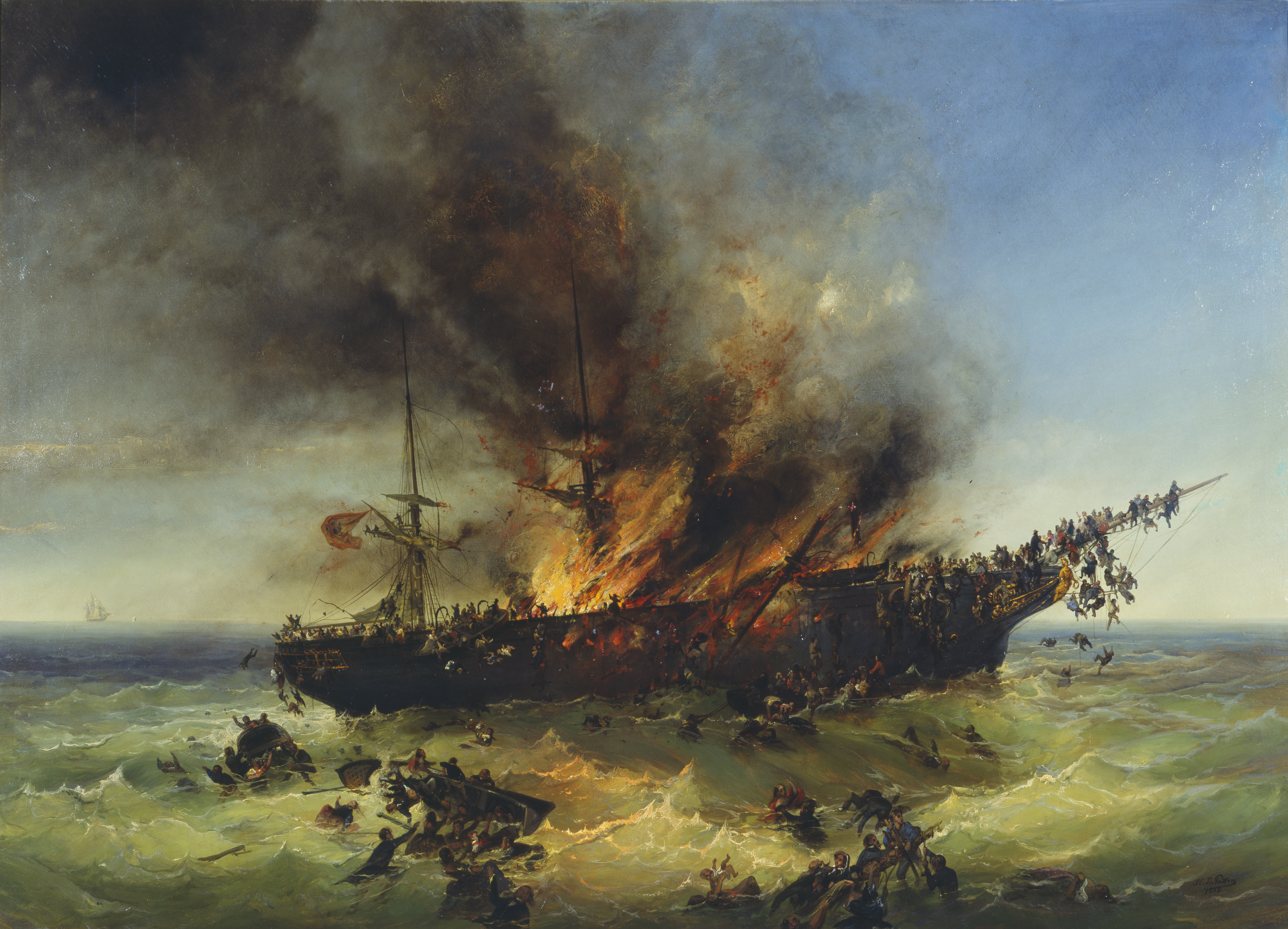
Sinking of the SS Austria, at the Deutsches Historisches Museum.

On 1 September 1858, SS Austria captained by F. A. Heydtmann sailed from Hamburg on her third voyage to New York City. At approximately 12:00, on 13 September, at coordinates 45°01′N 41°30′W, following a procedure to fumigate steerage by dipping a red-hot chain into a bucket of tar; the chain became too hot for the boatswain to hold, and it was dropped onto the deck, which immediately burst into flames; although the ship was traveling at only half speed it was impossible to stop the engines as the engine crew had become asphyxiated. When the helmsman abandoned the wheel, the ship swung into the wind, spreading the flames down the length of the ship, racing through the mahogany veneer and varnished bulkheads, as passengers jumped into the sea. The passing barque, Maurice of France, rescued most of the survivors (67), and the Catarina of Norway picked up more (22) the next morning. As the blackened hulk was left to sink, all but 89 of 542 passengers were lost. Survivors were transported back towards Europe to the Portuguese North Atlantic island at Faial, Azores.

=== Survivors ===
Amongst the survivors were:

- Theodore Eisfeld, New York Philharmonic music director. He wrote a letter of gratitude to the d'Orey family in Faial for their care.
- Dr Hubert Scheck, a teacher at the Friedrich Wilhelm Lyceum in Cologne, was treated for severe burns in Faial, Azores where he and one other passenger remained for a long recovery. While in Faial, he was also cared for by the d'Orey family.

=== Drowned ===
Amongst those who drowned were:

- Henriette Wulff, friend and frequent correspondent of Hans Christian Andersen
- Adolph Starmont, merchant for S.F. White & Bro., Chicago, IL

=== Paintings of the disaster ===
The fire and subsequent sinking has featured in multiple paintings, including:

- Josef Püttner, "Untergang der Austria", Deutsches Historisches Museum, Berlin, Germany.
- Eugène Isabey, "L'incendie de l'Austria", Musée national de la Marine, Paris, France; "L'Incendie du steamer Austria", Musée des Beaux-Arts, Bordeaux, France;
- Anonymous, "Burning of the Austria", National Maritime Museum, Greenwich, England.
- Le duc Charles, "L'Incendie de l'Austria", Chateau des ducs de Bretagne, Musée d'Histoire de Nantes, Nantes, France.
