= Albert Ballin =

German businessman

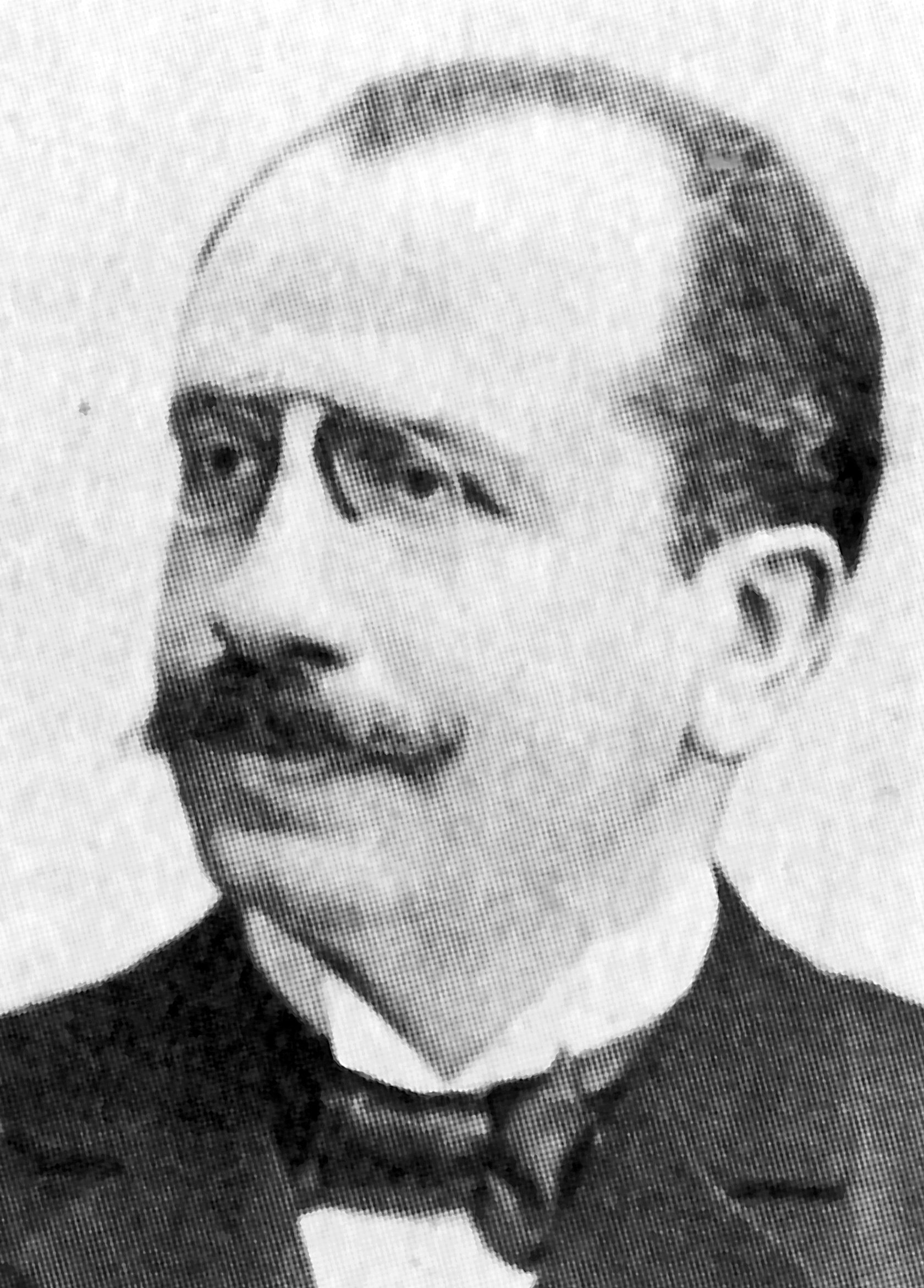
- Born: 15 August 1857; Hamburg
- Died: 9 November 1918 (aged 61); Hamburg
- Occupations: Owner and manager of the Hamburg America Line

Albert Ballin (15 August 1857 – 9 November 1918) was a German shipping magnate. He was the general director of the Hamburg-Amerikanische Packetfahrt-Actien-Gesellschaft (HAPAG) or Hamburg-America Line, which for a time was the world's largest shipping company. Being the inventor of the concept of the cruise ship, he is known as the father of modern cruise ship travel. Albert Ballin was a risk-taker who was willing to challenge his colleagues, foreign competitors, and domestic politics in order to build a successful shipping company. He focused on British rivals and was determined to expand HAPAG's global reach, he also worked closely with the Kaiser and supported expansion of the German navy.

Augusta Victoria, named after the German Empress Augusta Victoria of Schleswig-Holstein entered transatlantic service on 10 May 1889, from Hamburg to New York City via Southampton. Two years later, in 1891, she made the World's first Mediterranean cruise.

In 1901, Ballin built the Emigration Halls on the Hamburg island of Veddel to accommodate the many thousands of people from all over Europe who arrived at the Port of Hamburg every week to emigrate to North and South America on his company's ships. The island is now the BallinStadt Museum. In 1913, HAPAG owned three of the world's biggest ocean liners; however all were later seized as part of World War I reparations.

Facing the loss of his company's ships after World War I, Ballin committed suicide in Hamburg as the war ended.

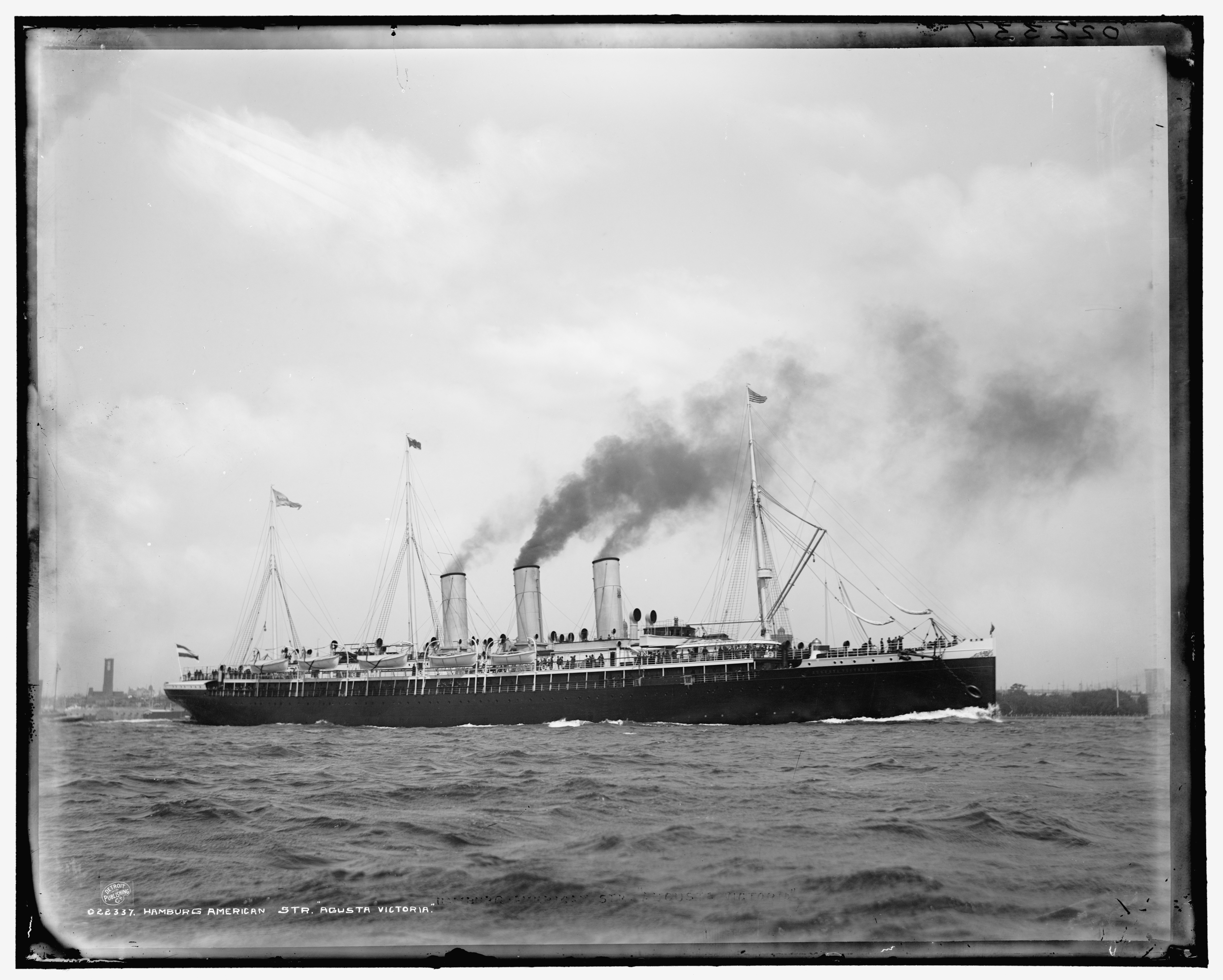
Augusta Victoria as launched, about 1890

== Business ==
His father, Samuel Joseph Ballin (1804–1874), was a Danish Jew who had emigrated from Denmark. Samuel was part owner of an emigration agency that arranged passages to the United States, and when he died in 1874, young Albert took over the business. He developed it into an independent shipping line, saving costs by carrying cargo on the return trip from the US. This brought him to the attention of the Hamburg America Line; the line hired him in 1886 and made him general director in 1899.

Although extremely successful in developing the business, as a Jew, and only being the director, but not the owner of a company, he was not accepted by all of Hamburg society. Nevertheless, he was respected and admired by Kaiser Wilhelm II, by whom he was honoured with "hoffähigkeit" (right of presentation at court). Ballin's home in Hamburg, which currently houses the UNESCO Institute for Lifelong Learning, has a suite of rooms that were built specifically for the Kaiser, to be used when he visited Hamburg. Many different ship companies began to include ocean liners among their fleets to add luxury and comfort to sea travel. Due to bad weather conditions in the winter months, the transatlantic ocean liners could not operate at full capacity. Ballin developed a plan to increase occupancy by offering idle ships to travel agencies in Europe and America in the winter.

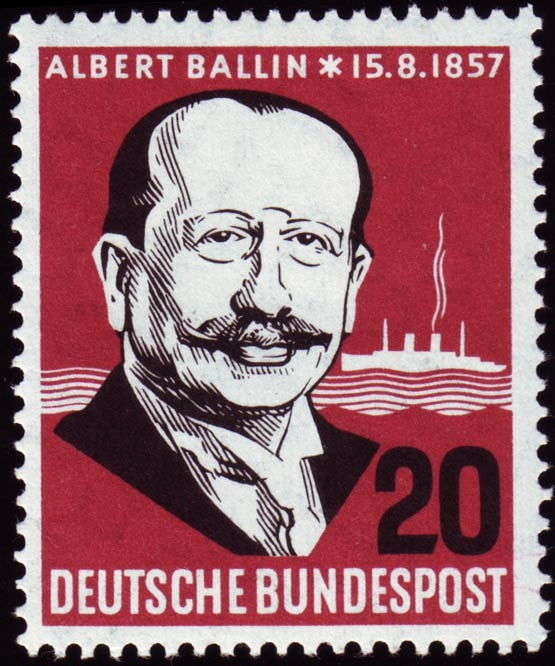
Postage stamp issued by the Deutsche Bundespost in 1957 in commemoration of Ballin's 100th birthday

The first modern cruise, which defined the journey not just as transport but as the actual reward, commenced on 22 January 1891, when Augusta Victoria sailed to cruise the Mediterranean for six weeks. Competitors at first ridiculed Ballin, who organized and supervised the voyage personally, but the project was a huge success. In order to accommodate the growing demand, another three of Auguste Victoria's sister ships operated as cruise liners, and in 1899, the Hamburg-America Line commissioned Blohm & Voss to construct the first purpose-built cruise ship, the Prinzessin Victoria Luise. It was the very first ship specifically built as a cruise ship, one exclusively tailored for the needs of well-to-do passengers.

Ballin further expanded the fleet in 1900 when he acquired fourteen steamships from A. C. de Freitas & Co. In 1901, Ballin built the Emigration Halls (now the Museum "BallinStadt") on the Hamburg island of Veddel to accommodate the many thousands of people from all over Europe who arrived at the Port of Hamburg every week to emigrate to North and South America on his company's ships.

Ballin frequently traveled on the ships in his fleet and often spoke to other passengers to understand more about the ships and what improvements to make to Hamburg Amerika ships in the future. Ballin would take these ideas for improvements in hand and make sure they were implemented on both his current and future liners.

== World War I ==
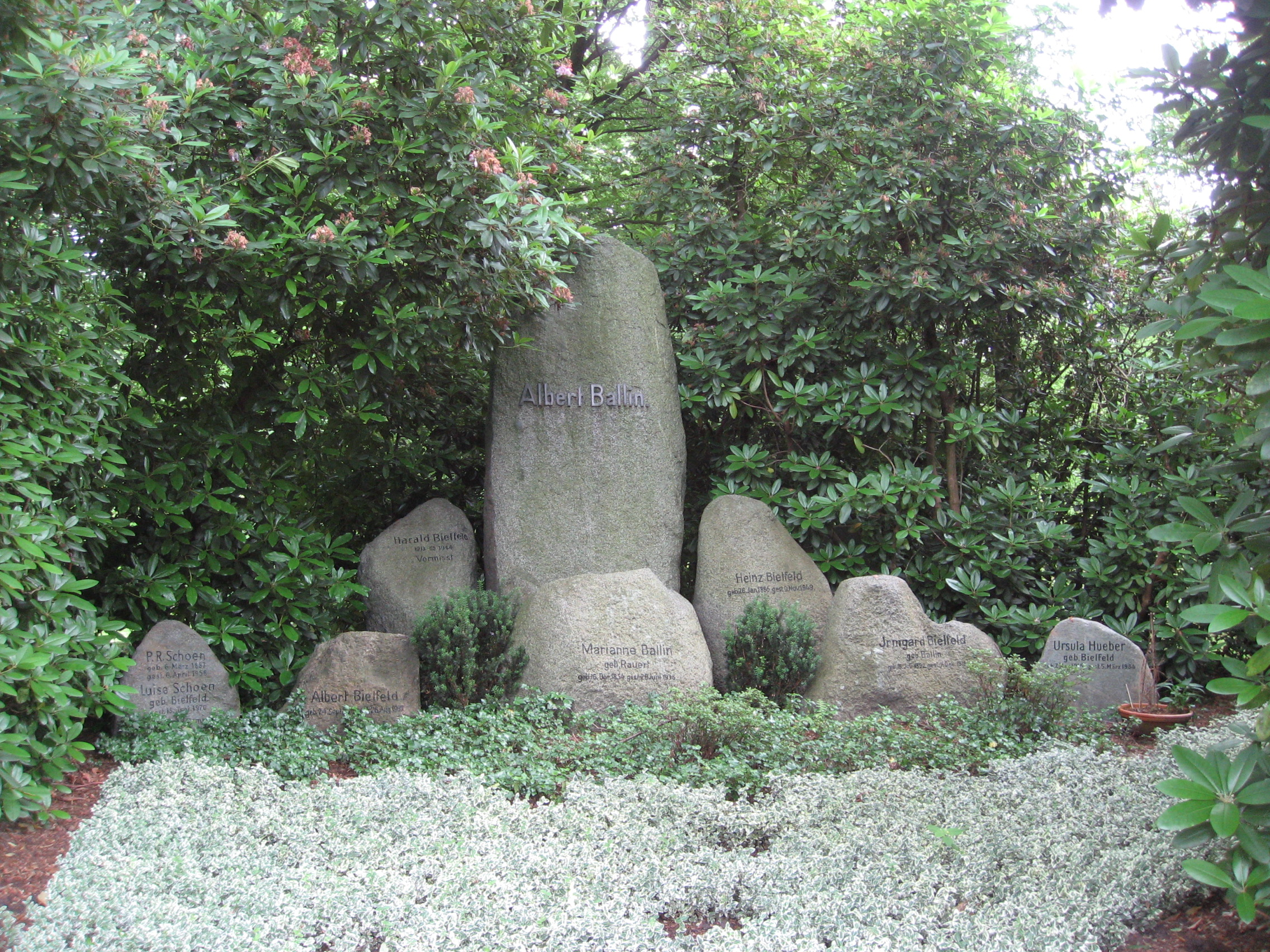
Albert Ballin's gravestone in Hamburg, Germany. It is located on landlot Q9, 430–433 in Ohlsdorf Cemetery.

Ballin acted as mediator between Great Britain and the German Empire in the tense years prior to the outbreak of World War I. Terrified that he would lose his ships in the event of naval hostilities, Ballin attempted to broker a deal whereby Britain and Germany would continue to race one another in passenger liners but desist in their attempts to best one another's naval fleets. Working with his close friend the British financier Ernest Cassel, they convinced the governments in London and Berlin to negotiate a solution to the naval arms race through the Haldane Mission of 1912. Unfortunately it was a failure. Consequently, the outbreak of war deeply disillusioned him. Following U.21's sinking of the British ships Malachite and Primo in November 1914, Ballin advocated for unrestricted submarine warfare by German U-boats to blockade Britain's sea lines of communication. Many of the Hamburg-America Line's ships were lost or suffered considerable damage during the hostilities.

Completely distraught upon hearing the news of the abdication of his benefactor and protector, Kaiser Wilhelm II, Ballin committed suicide by taking an overdose of sleeping pills two days before the armistice ended World War I. Ballin's fears were soon to be realized; the company's flagships, the triumvirate Imperator, Vaterland and Bismarck, were ceded as war prizes to Great Britain and the United States.

== Honors ==
The Albert Ballin was named in his honor, as is the Ballindamm, a street in central Hamburg. A postage stamp was issued by the Deutsche Bundespost in 1957 in commemoration of Ballin's 100th birthday.

== Bibliography ==
- Mark A. Russell. Steamship Nationalism: Ocean Liners and National Identity in Imperial Germany and the Atlantic World (Routledge, 2020). 354 pp. ISBN 978-1-03-223650-6. online review
- Lamar Cecil, Albert Ballin; Business and Politics in Imperial Germany, 1888–1918 (Princeton University Press, 1967)
- Tobias Brinkmann: Why Paul Nathan Attacked Albert Ballin: The Transatlantic Mass Migration and the Privatization of Prussia's Eastern Border Inspection, 1886–1914. In: Central European History. 43, Nr. 01, 2010, S. 47–83. doi:10.1017/S0008938909991336
- Bernhard Huldermann, Albert Ballin (Berlin: Gerhard Stalling, 1922)
- Johannes Gerhardt: Albert Ballin (English edition) (Hamburg University Press, 2010)

online

- Drew Keeling, “The Business of Transatlantic Migration between Europe and the United States, 1900–1914” (Chronos, 2012) ISBN 978-3034011525
