= SS New York (1927) =

German passenger liner

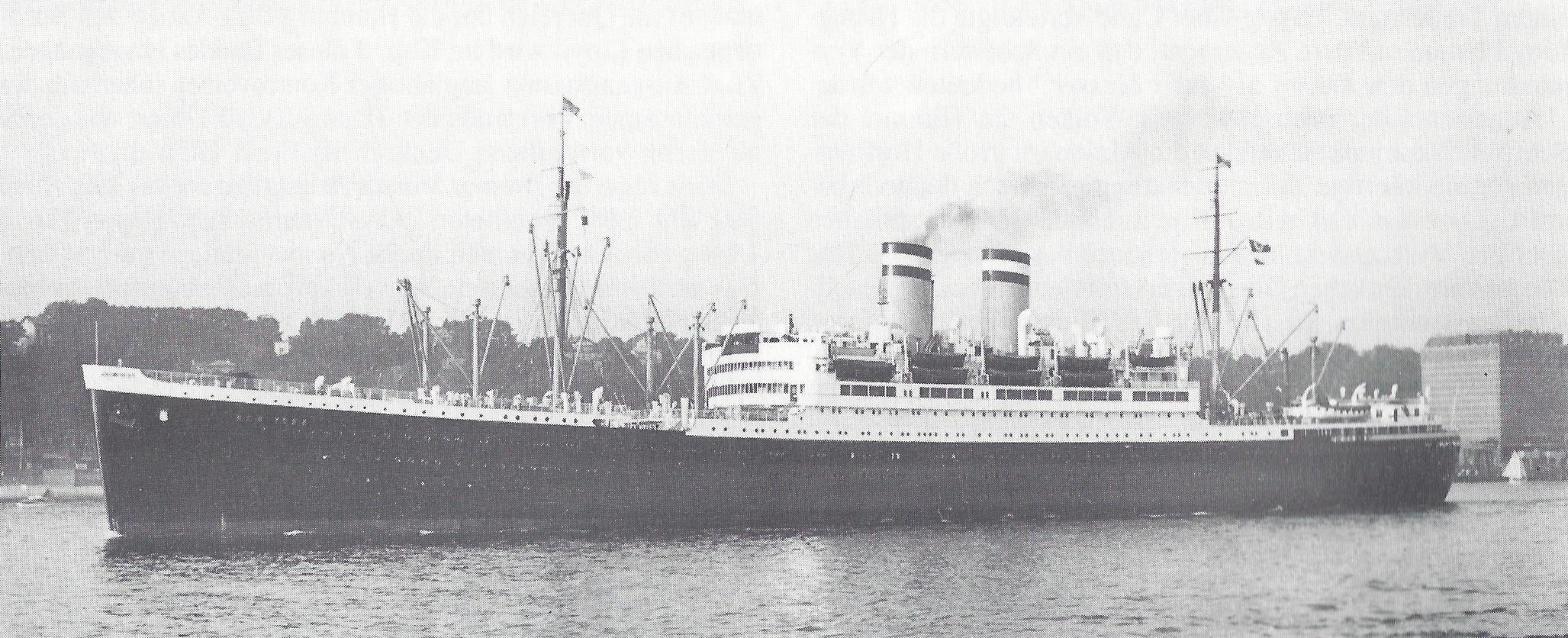
- SS New York

History

Germany
- Name: SS New York
- Namesake: New York
- Operator: Hamburg-America Line (1927-1940); Kriegsmarine (1940-1945)
- Builder: Blohm & Voss, Hamburg
- Launched: 20 October 1926
- Commissioned: Hamburg-America Line: 12 March, 1927; Kriegsmarine: May 1940
- Fate: 1945, Bombed and sunk at Kiel. 1950, final hulk scrapped by West of Scotland Shipbreaking Company.

General characteristics
- Type: Ocean liner
- Tonnage: As built: 21,455 gross registered tons; 1934 refit: 22,334 gross registered tons
- Length: As built: 193.50 metres (634.8 ft) (LOA); 1934 refit: 207.40 metres (680.4 ft) (LOA)
- Beam: 22.07 metres (72.4 ft)
- Installed power: As built: 14,000 PS (10,000 kW); 1930 refit: 29,000 PS (21,000 kW)
- Propulsion: twin steam turbine; 2 Propeller
- Speed: As built: 16 knots (30 km/h; 18 mph); 1930 refit: 19 knots (35 km/h; 22 mph)
- Capacity: As built: 247 first class; 320 second class; 470 third class; 1934 refit: 210 first class passengers; 350 second class passengers; 400 third class passengers
- Crew: 420

SS New York was a German passenger liner launched in 1926 for the Hamburg-America Line and was the sister to the SS Albert Ballin, SS Deutschland, and SS Hamburg. During World War II the ship continued its passenger service until 1940, when the Kriegsmarine requisitioned her as a accommodation ship for the war. On April 3, 1945, the ship was sunk in an air raid at Kiel. She was later raised during a harbor cleanup and was scrapped, starting in 1949.

== Background & design ==
After the launching of the SS Hamburg, Hamburg-America Line ordered its next ship of the Albert Ballin class of liners. The ship would be laid down by the Blohm & Voss shipyard as yard No 474 and was launched on 20 October 1926, as the SS New York.

She differed little from her previous sister Hamburg; only the passenger accommodations are modified due to the declining importance of emigrant trade. Like her sisters, she was refitted with more powerful steam turbines between November 1929 and 16 April 1930, which increased her service speed to 19 knots. Between 24 March and 30 May 1934, her length was increased by about 12 meters by adding a fore-shoe to the bow, which could enabled her to reach a top speed of 21.5 knots; however this idea was abandoned, and the rebuild used the achieve planned speed since 1930 with considerably lower engine power and to reduce fuel consumption. During the refit, her external appearance was also changed uniformly and the passenger interior were improved.

== History ==
=== Pre-war ===
On 1 April 1927, the ship undertook her maiden voyage on the Hamburg to New York route. On 31 January 1928, she was the first Albert Ballin-class ship to take a cruise from New York via Madeira to the Mediterranean Sea and on to Istanbul, before ending on April 1 in Hamburg.

On 18 and 19 December 1934, the New York assisted in the distress call of the small Norwegian steamer Sisto. The sixteen-man crew of the Sisto were rescued by a lifeboat from the New York under the command of her Second Officer, after the British tanker Mobiloil had released oil to calm the sea, and two other ships, the Aurania and the Europa, illuminated the scene with their searchlights. The New York took the rescued crew to Southampton.

In 1939, the New York was just off New York at the end of August. She refueled there and then sailed again to reach Germany before the outbreak of World War II. She arrived in neutral Murmansk on 8 September. On 10 November 1939, the New York reached Kiel-Holtenau after a cruise along the Norwegian coast.

=== World War 2 ===
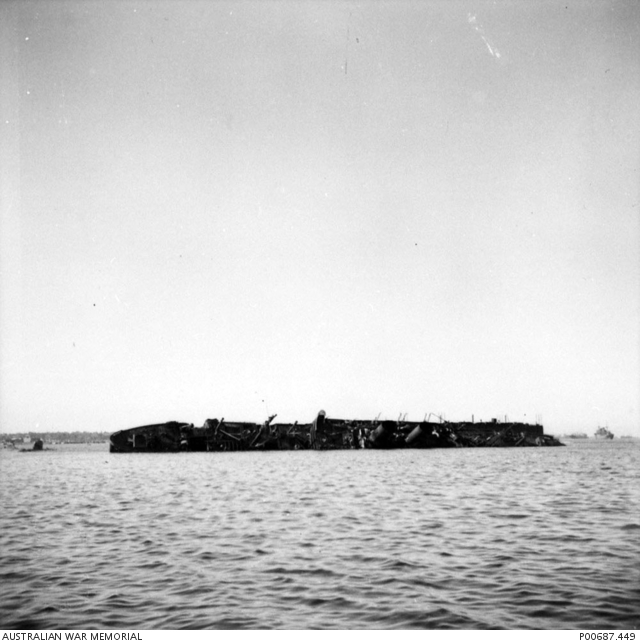
SS New York sunk at Kiel in 1945

From May to August 1940, the New York, which was berthed in Gotenhafen as a barracks ship for the Kriegsmarine, gathered seafaring personnel, including 225 recruits from the 11th Ship's Main Division from Stralsund, for the battleship Bismarck, which was due to be commissioned. On 11 August 1940, she and her personnels reached the port of Hamburg via the Kiel Canal, where the battleship was being commissioned on 24 August. In December 1941, she was stationed in Kiel-Wik as a barracks ship.

The New York was sunk on 3 April 1945 near Kieler Förde during a second heavy attack by the 8th US Air Force, in which over 700 aircraft were involved. After the war, The capsized New York was later raised, towed through the Kiel Canal to England in 1949, and auctioned of for scrapping. In 1950 the ship was fully scrapped in Ayrshire at the Scotland Shipbreaking Company.

== See also ==
- Wilhelm Cuno, Director General of the Hamburg America Line who oversaw the ship's construction and launch

== Bibliography ==
- Arnold Kludas: Die Geschichte der deutschen Passagierschiffahrt. Bd. IV Vernichtung und Wiedergeburt 1914 bis 1930. Schriften des Deutschen Schiffahrtsmuseum, Volume 21
- Arnold Kludas: Die Geschichte der deutschen Passagierschiffahrt. Bd. V Eine Ära geht zu Ende 1930 bis 1990. Schriften des Deutschen Schiffahrtsmuseum, Volume 22
- Claus Rothe: Deutsche Ozean-Passagierschiffe 1896 bis 1918. Steiger, Moers 1986, ISBN 3-921564-80-8.
- Doris Tillmann, Johannes Rosenplänter (Hrsg.): Kiel-Lexikon. Wachholtz, Neumünster 2011, ISBN 978-3-529-02556-3, Lemma Wrackbergung.
