= SS Lombardia =

Passenger steam ship launched in 1914

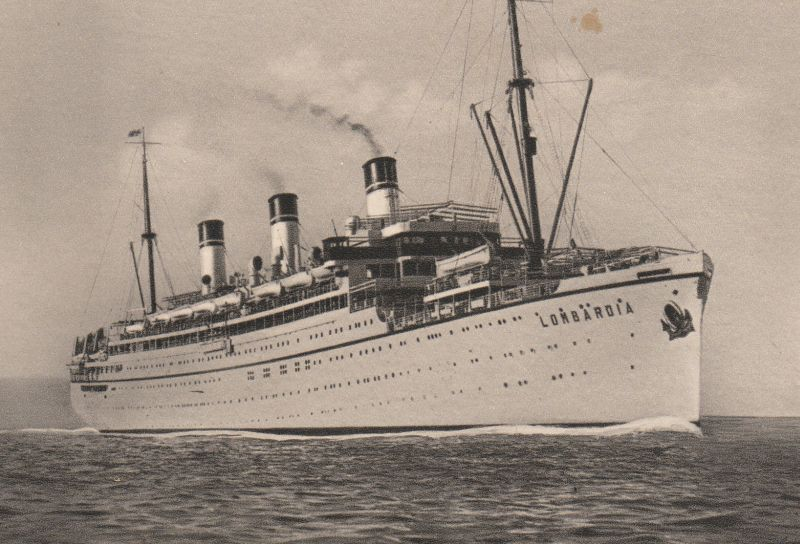
- Lombardia in 1936

History
- Name: 1914: William O'Swald; 1920: Brabantia; 1922: Resolute; 1935: Lombardia
- Namesake: 1914: William O'Swald; 1920: North Brabant; 1935: Lombardy
- Owner: 1915: HAPAG; 1916: Kon. Rotterdamsche Lloyd; 1922: United American Lines; 1926: HAPAG; 1935: Flotte Riuniti Cosulich-Lloyd Sabaudo; 1936: Lloyd Triestino
- Port of registry: 1920: (Netherlands) Amsterdam; 1922: (United States); 1923: Panama City; 1926: (Weimar Republic) Hamburg; 1935: (Kingdom of Italy) Genoa
- Route: 1920: Amsterdam – Buenos Aires; 1922: Hamburg – New York
- Builder: AG Weser
- Yard number: 193
- Launched: 30 March 1914
- Completed: 28 July 1920
- Maiden voyage: 1 September 1920
- Reclassified: 1935: troop ship
- Refit: 1922
- Identification: code letters RFVL (1926–33); call sign DHTY (1934–35); call sign IBVS (1935–43)
- Fate: Bombed 1943, raised and scrapped 1946

General characteristics
- Type: Ocean liner
- Tonnage: 1930: 19,464 GRT, 13,165 NRT; 1932: 19,703 GRT, 9,583 NRT; 1936: 20,006 GRT, 10,947 NRT
- Length: 590.4 ft (180.0 m)
- Beam: 72.2 ft (22.0 m)
- Depth: 40.2 ft (12.3 m)
- Decks: 4
- Propulsion: 3 × screws; 2 × triple-expansion engines; 1 × exhaust steam turbine
- Speed: 17 knots (31 km/h)
- Capacity: 1920: 355 1st class, 284 2nd class, 469 3rd class, 857 steerage; 1922: 290 1st class, 320 2nd class, 400 3rd class
- Sensors & processing systems: by 1930: submarine signalling; wireless direction finding; by 1934: gyrocompass
- Notes: sister ship: Reliance

SS Lombardia was one of a pair of transatlantic steam ocean liners that were launched in 1914 in Germany for the Hamburg America Line (HAPAG), sold to a Dutch shipping line in 1916, and seized by the United States as World War I reparations in 1922. United American Lines (UAL) operated her until 1926, when HAPAG bought her back.

Lombardia was launched as William O'Swald. Her Dutch operator renamed her Brabantia, while UAL renamed her Resolute. Her sister ship was Reliance, which had been launched as Johann Heinrich Burchard.

In 1935 Flotte Riuniti Cosulich-Lloyd Sabaudo bought Resolute from HAPAG, renamed her Lombardia and had her converted into a troop ship. In 1936 she passed to Lloyd Triestino.

In 1943 an Allied air attack sank Lombardia in the Mediterranean. In 1946 her wreck was raised and scrapped.

== Building ==
AG Weser built the ship in Bremen. Margarete O'Swald launched her on 30 March 1914, naming her after her father William O'Swald (1832–1923), a former Mayor of Hamburg. After the First World War began in July 1914, work to complete the ship was paused.

In the First World War the Imperial German Navy sank numerous neutral Dutch ships in error, including two passenger liners and numerous cargo ships. Koninklijke Rotterdamsche Lloyd (KRL) lost four cargo ships: Palembang and Kediri in 1916 and Bandoeng and Jacarta in 1917. The German government persuaded HAPAG to sell William O'Swald to KRL. Delivery was deferred until after the war.

The ship had three funnels and two masts. Her registered length was 590.4 ft (180.0 m), her beam was 80.5 ft (24.5 m) and her depth was 39.7 ft (12.1 m). As built, she had capacity for 1,965 passengers: 355 first class, 284 second class, 469 third class and 850 steerage.

The ship had three screws. A pair of four-cylinder triple-expansion steam engines drove her port and starboard screws. Exhaust steam from their low-pressure cylinders powered a low-pressure steam turbine that drove her middle screw. Between them the three engines gave her a speed of 17 knots (31 km/h).

== KRL service ==
On 28 July 1920 William O'Swald was delivered to KRL. Her new owner changed her name to Brabantia, after the Dutch province of North Brabant. On 1 September 1920 she began her maiden voyage from Amsterdam to Buenos Aires.

On the route she joined her sister ship Johann Heinrich Burchard, which had been sold to another Dutch shipping line, Koninklijke Rotterdamsche Lloyd, and renamed Limburgia. At the time, the two ships were the largest on the route between Europe and the River Plate.

== UAL service ==
One source states that the Allied Reparations Committee awarded Limburgia and Brabantia to the United States. Another states that W. Averell Harriman's United American Lines (UAL) bought the two ships from KHL and KRL.

Either way, KHL and KRL handed Limburgia and Brabantia to UAL on 4 January 1922. UAL renamed Limburgia as Reliance, had Blohm & Voss in Hamburg refit her as a three-class ship. Her passenger capacity was reduced to 1,010 berths: 290 first class, 320 second class and 400 third class.

UAL put Resolute into scheduled service between Hamburg and New York. Initially UAL registered Reliance in the US, but in 1923 she was re-registered in Panama to circumvent prohibition in the United States.

In 1924 Resolute made her first round-the-world cruise. It started from New York on 19 January, and ended there on 24 May.

== HAPAG service ==
UAL had a business relationship with HAPAG. On 6 August 1926 HAPAG took over UAL, and with it former HAPAG liners including Resolute. On 10 August she left Hamburg for New York on her first voyage with her new owner. In 1927 she began her first HAPAG cruise, and from 1934 HAPAG used her for cruising full-time. HAPAG had her hull repainted white to suit her cruising role.

Resolute's tonnages were 19,464 GRT and 13,165 NRT by 1930 and 19,703 GRT and 9,583 NRT by 1932. Her German code letters were RFVL until 1933–34, when they were superseded by the call sign DHTY. Also by 1934 her navigation equipment included a gyrocompass.

== Italian service ==
In 1935 Flotte Riuniti Cosulich-Lloyd Sabaudo bought Resolute, renamed her Lombardia after the Italian province of Lombardy, and had her refitted as a troop ship for use in the Italian invasion of Abyssinia. In 1936 Lombardia passed to Lloyd Triestino. Also by 1936 her tonnages were revised to 20,006 GRT and 10,947 NRT.

On 4 August 1943 Lombardia was in Naples when an Allied air raid set her on fire and sank her. Her wreck was raised in 1946, towed to La Spezia, and scrapped.

== Bibliography ==
- Harnack, Edwin P (1930) [1903]. All About Ships & Shipping (3rd ed.). London: Faber and Faber.
- Wilson, RM (1956). The Big Ships. London: Cassell & Co.
