= SS Hamburg (1925) =

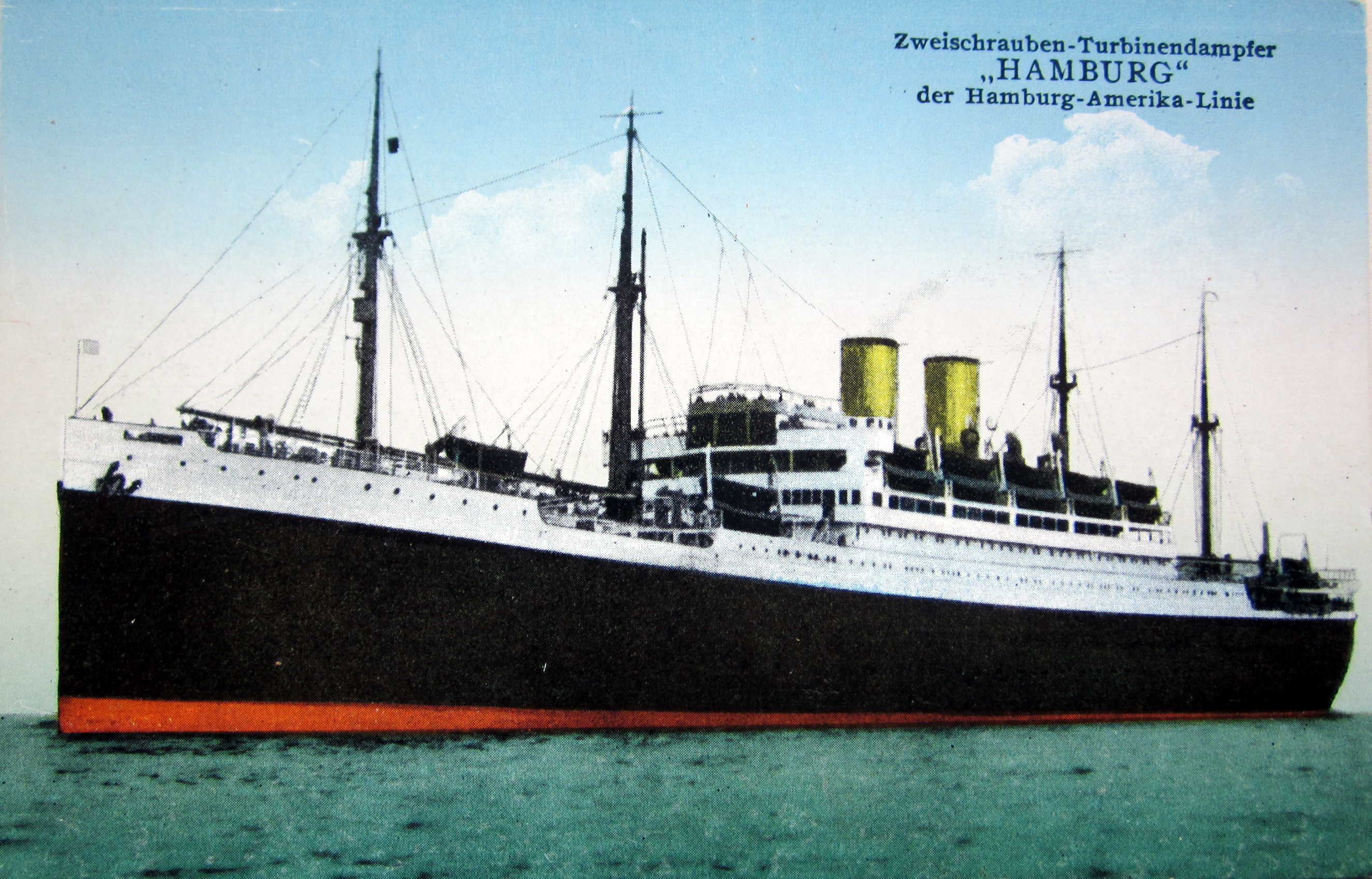
- SS Hamburg

History

Weimar Republic
- Name: SS Hamburg
- Owner: Hamburg America Line
- Route: Hamburg–New York City
- Builder: Blohm & Voss, Hamburg, Germany
- Yard number: 473
- Launched: 14 November 1925
- In service: 28 March 1926
- Fate: Sold to the Kriegsmarine

Nazi Germany
- Name: Hamburg
- Operator: Kriegsmarine
- Commissioned: 1 January 1940
- Fate: Sunk by mine, 7 March 1945

Soviet Union
- Name: Yuri Dolgoruki
- Acquired: By salvage, 1950
- In service: 12 July 1960
- Fate: Scrapped, 1977

General characteristics
- Type: Ocean liner
- Tonnage: 22,117 GRT
- Displacement: 28,000 t (27,560 long tons)
- Length: 206.50 m (677 ft 6 in)
- Beam: 24 m (78 ft 9 in)
- Height: 16.92 m (55 ft 6 in)
- Draught: 9.95 m (32 ft 8 in)
- Decks: 5
- Installed power: 28,000 PS (20,590 kW; 27,620 shp)
- Propulsion: 2 steam turbines, 2 5.20 m (17.1 ft) propellers
- Speed: 19 knots (35 km/h; 22 mph)
- Range: 9,600 nmi (17,800 km; 11,000 mi) at 19 knots
- Capacity: 222 first class passengers; 471 second class; 456 third class

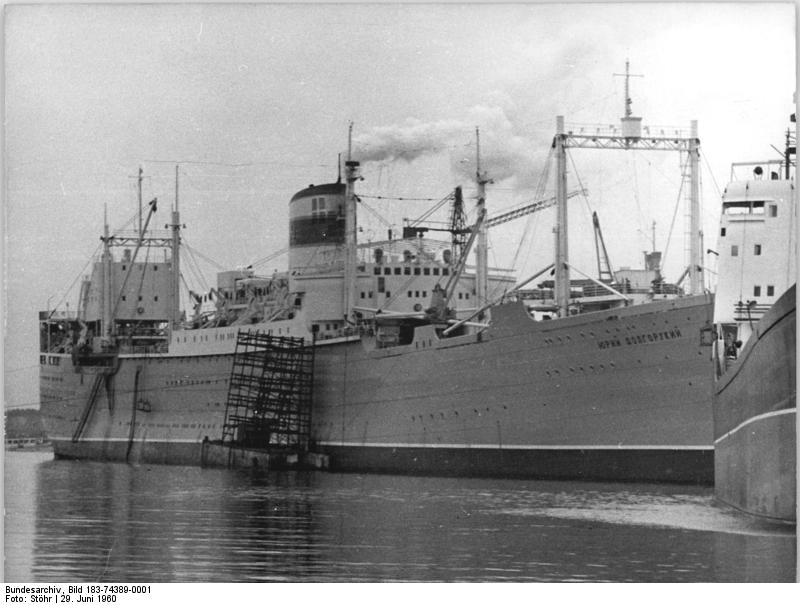
Yuri Dolgoruki

SS Hamburg was a German ocean liner owned by the Hamburg America Line, built by the Blohm & Voss of Hamburg, Germany, and launched in 1925. She had a sister ship, SS New York. They were similar to the SS Albert Ballin.

During World War II, the ship became a naval accommodation ship for the Kriegsmarine in 1940 and served with the 7th U-boat Flotilla in Kiel. Reassigned to 3rd U-boat Flotilla on 1 March 1941, Hamburg was transferred to 6th U-boat Flotilla in Danzig in October. From June 1943, Hamburg was relocated to Gotenhafen and assigned to 8th U-boat Flotilla. On 7 March 1945 during the evacuation of Germans from the Eastern Front, she struck a mine and sank off Saßnitz in position 54°30′00″N 13°42′02″E.

The wreck was raised by the Soviets and converted to a whaler at Warnowwerft, Warnemünde, from 7 November 1950. Becoming Yuri Dolgoruki, the ship was put in service on 12 July 1960. She was then broken up in 1977.

== Bibliography ==
- Gröner, Erich (1988). Hilfsschiffe II: Lazarettschiffe, Wohnschiffe, Schulschiffe, Forschungsfahrzeuge, Hafenbetriebsfahrzeuge (I). Die deutschen Kriegsschiffe 1815–1945 (in German). Vol. V. Koblenz: Bernard & Graefe. ISBN 3-7637-4804-0.
