= Hamburg America Line =

German ocean shipping line (1847–1970)

- HAPAG flag
- Native name: Hamburg-Amerikanische Paketfahrt-Aktien-Gesellschaft
- Industry: shipping
- Founded: 1847
- Founder: Albert Ballin (Director General), Adolph Godeffroy, Ferdinand Laeisz, Carl Woermann, and August Bolten
- Defunct: 1 September 1970
- Fate: Merged with Norddeutscher Lloyd
- Successor: Hapag-Lloyd
- Headquarters: Hamburg, Germany

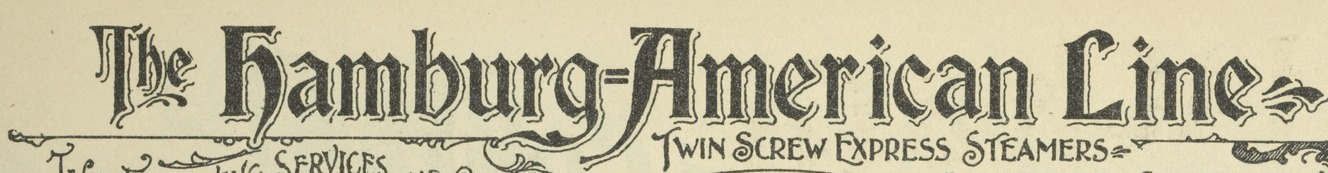
"Twin Screw Express Steamers" 1899 ad

The Hamburg-Amerikanische Packetfahrt-Actien-Gesellschaft (HAPAG), known in English as the Hamburg America Line, was a transatlantic shipping enterprise established in Hamburg, in 1847. Among those involved in its development were prominent German citizens such as Albert Ballin (director general), Adolph Godeffroy, Ferdinand Laeisz, Carl Woermann, August Bolten, and others, and its main financial backers were Berenberg Bank and H. J. Merck & Co. It soon developed into the largest German, and at times the world's largest, shipping company, serving the market created by German immigration to the United States and later, immigration from Eastern Europe. On 1 September 1970, after 123 years of independent existence, HAPAG merged with the Bremen-based North German Lloyd to form Hapag-Lloyd AG, today an international shipping and container transportation company.

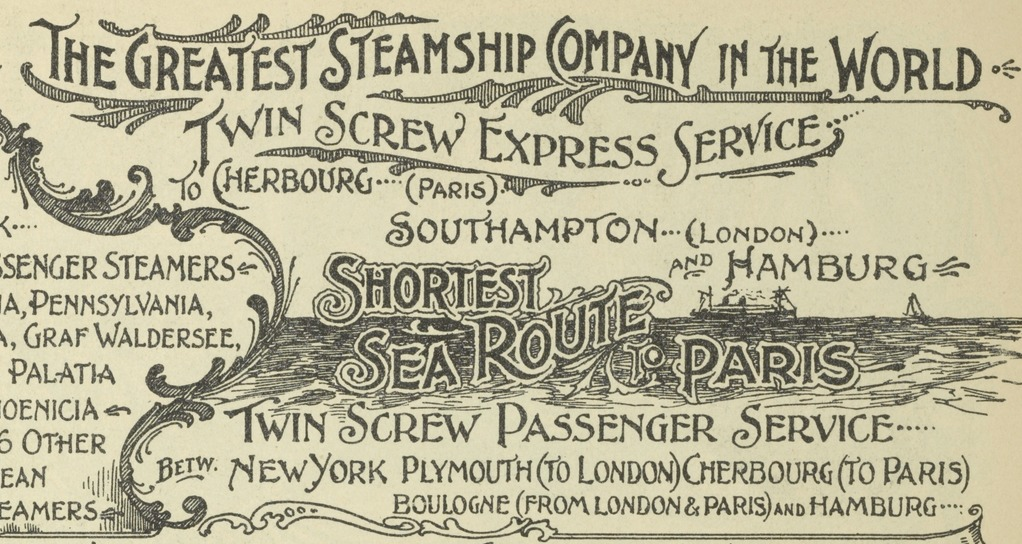
1899 ad in The Mail and Express (New York City)

== History ==
=== Ports served ===
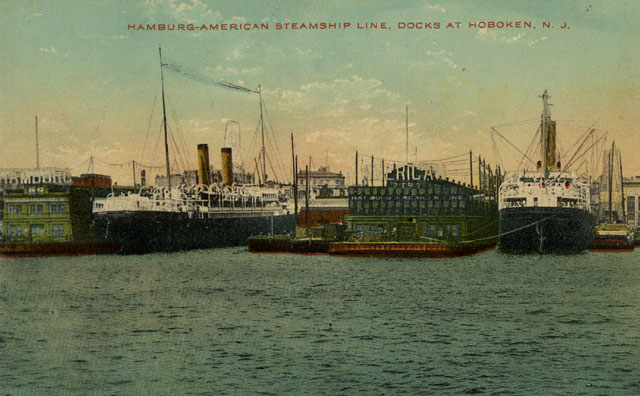
Postcard of the view from the water of the Hamburg-American Steamship Lines docks in Hoboken, New Jersey, in about 1910

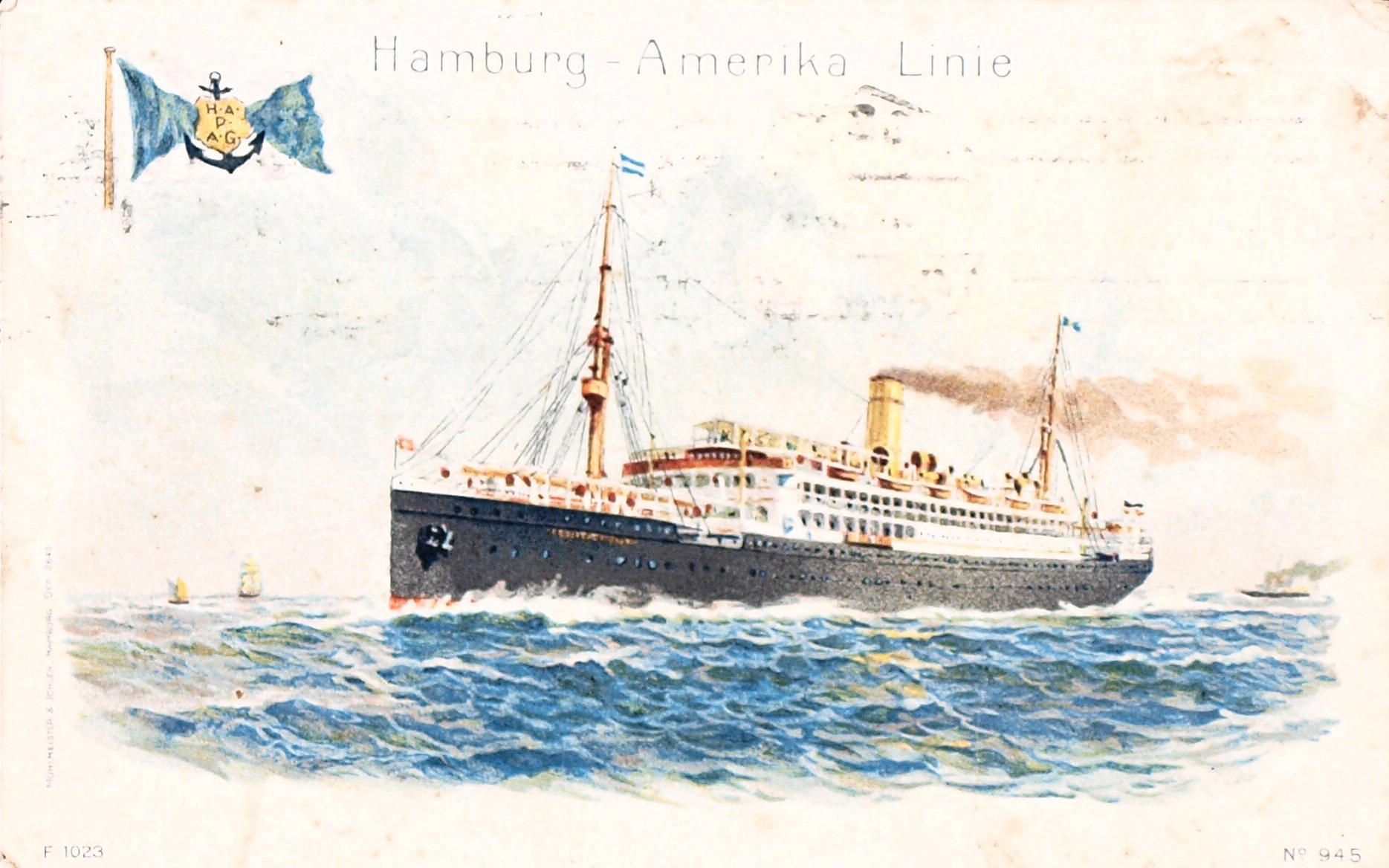
Postcard from the Hamburg-American Line steamship König Friedrich August, issued 1911

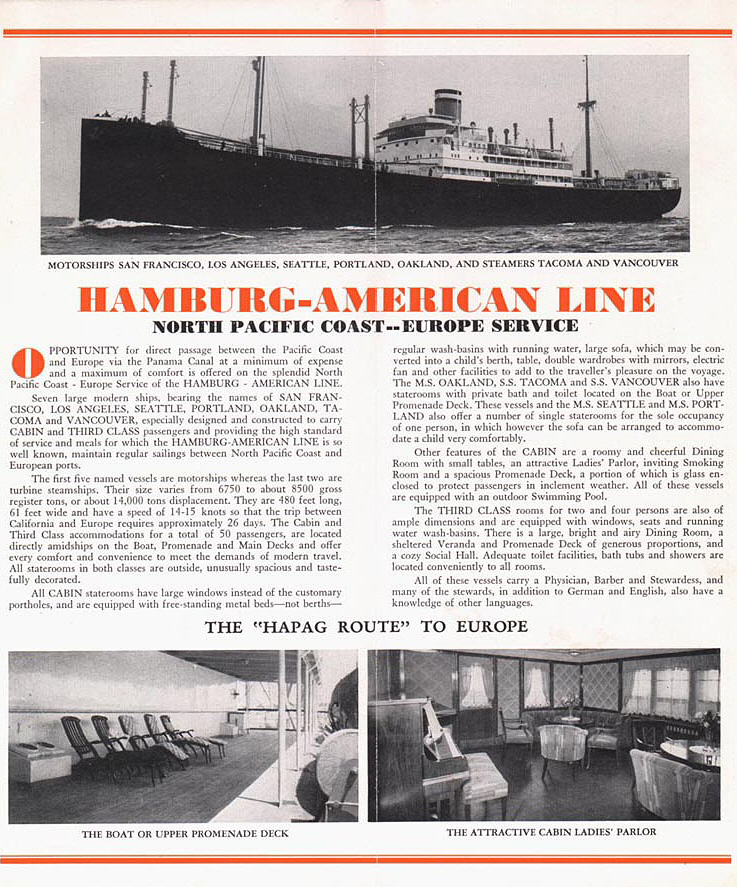
Advertisement for the Hamburg-American Line (1930)

In the early years, the Hamburg America Line exclusively connected European ports with North American ports, such as Hoboken or New Orleans. With time, however, the company established lines to all continents. The company built a large ocean liner terminal at Cuxhaven, Germany, in 1900. Connected directly to Hamburg by a dedicated railway line and station, the HAPAG Terminal at Cuxhaven served as the major departure point for German and European immigrants to North America until 1969 when ocean liner travel ceased. Today it serves as a museum and cruise ship terminal.

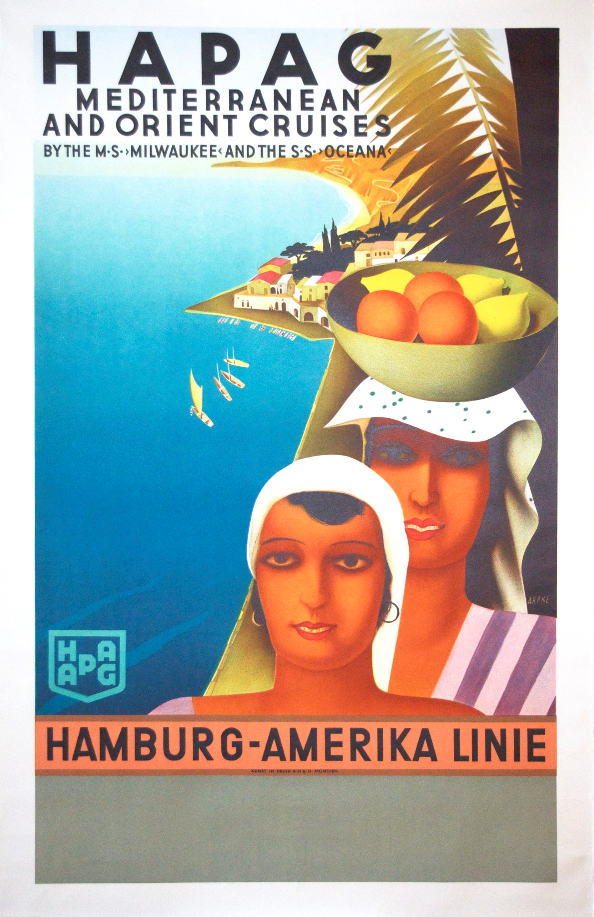
Poster by Otto Arpke (1931)

=== Jewish emigration to North America ===
Following pogroms in the Russian Empire, the majority of Jews within the Pale of Settlement left for the United States. Between 1880 and 1924 roughly 2–3 million Jews emigrated from Eastern Europe to North America, making it the largest migration in history, most of them using the Hamburg America Line.

=== Atlas Service ===
The Atlas Service sailed from United States to Jamaica, Haiti, Colombia, Central America. The service was described as a way to "escape the rigors of Northern winters" through taking a Caribbean cruise and was promoted to tourists. The ships Altai, Sarnia, Sibiria, Alleghany, Alene, Adirondack, Valdivia, and Graecia provided this service in 1906.

=== Notable journeys ===
In 1858, its liner Austria sank, killing 449 people. In 1891, the cruise of the Augusta Victoria in the Mediterranean and the Near East from 22 January to 22 March, with 241 passengers including Albert Ballin and wife, is often stated to have been the first passenger cruise. Christian Wilhelm Allers published an illustrated account of it as "Bakschisch". In 1897, its steamer Arcadia was wrecked on the rocks off Newfoundland. In 1900, 1901 and 1903 its liner Deutschland won the Blue Riband taking the prize from the Kaiser Wilhelm der Grosse. In 1906 Prinzessin Victoria Luise ran aground off the coast of Jamaica. No people died by the grounding; however, the ship's captain committed suicide after getting all the passengers safely off the ship. In 1912, its liner SS Amerika was the first ship to warn Titanic of icebergs.

HAPAG's general director, Albert Ballin, believed that safety, size, comfort and luxury would always win out over speed. Thus he conceived the three largest liners yet to be built, named Imperator, Vaterland and Bismarck.

== First World War ==
The Imperator and the Vaterland were briefly in service before the First World War. In 1914, the Vaterland was caught in port at Hoboken at the outbreak of World War I and interned by the United States. She was seized, renamed Leviathan after the declaration of war on Germany in 1917, and served for the duration and beyond as a troopship. In 1917, its liner Allemannia was "torpedoed by German submarine near Alicante"; two people were lost.

== After World War One ==
After the war, the Vaterland/Leviathan was retained by the Americans as war reparations. In 1919 Vaterland's sister ships – Imperator and the unfinished Bismarck – were handed over to the allies as war reparations to Britain. They were sold to the Cunard Line and White Star Line respectively, and renamed Berengaria and Majestic. A ship chain in Mountain Lakes is identified by the historic society as belonging to either the Vaterland or Imperator. It was acquired in 1921, likely during refurbishments, and now lines a portion of the Boulevard.

In 1939, the HAPAG liner St. Louis was unable to find a port in Cuba, the United States, or Canada willing to accept the more than 950 Jewish refugees on board and had to return to Europe. On 9 April 1940, when German warships attacked Kristiansand, Norway, during Operation Weserübung (the opening assault of the Norwegian Campaign), the HAPAG freighter Seattle sailed into the crossfire between the warships and Norwegian coastal artillery. She was holed and sunk, and her crew briefly became prisoners of war.

According to a 1940 US intelligence report compiled by the US War Department, Louis Classing, general manager of the Hamburg-America in Havana was identified as a "well-known Nazi agent" who "imported moving pictures for propaganda purposes to be shown at local theaters". In 1941 it was further reported that Luis Classing fulfilled the "finances" position in the "probable Nazi organization in Cuba".

=== Later years ===
The Hamburg America Line lost almost the entirety of its fleet twice, as a result of World Wars I and II. In the post-war years, HAPAG rebuilt its fleet and focused on cargo container transport. In 1970, the company merged with its longstanding rival, Norddeutscher Lloyd of Bremen, to establish the present-day company Hapag-Lloyd. This merger formed one of the world's biggest container shipping companies. In 2008, Hapag-Lloyd was acquired by the City of Hamburg and a group of private investors, the Albert Ballin Consortium.

== Fleet list ==
Name(s)	Entered HAPAG service	Notes
Austria	1858	Caught fire and sank, 1 September 1858.
Teutonia	1858	Sold to Henry Flinn, 1877. Scrapped 1894 as Mentana.
Westphalia	1868	Sold to British owners in 1887, sold again to Italian owners in 1888, scrapped at Genoa in 1901 as "Sud America".
Silesia	1869	Sold 1887. Wrecked 1899 and subsequently scrapped.
Suevia	1874	Sold to Schiaffino, Nyer & Siges and renamed Quatre Amis, 1896. Scrapped 1898.
Augusta Victoria	1889	Rebuilt 1897. Sold to Imperial Russian Navy, 1904, and converted into auxiliary cruiser Kuban. Scrapped 1907
Columbia	1889 (1899)	Sold to Spanish Navy, 1898, and converted to auxiliary cruiser Rapido. Sold back to HAPAG and reverted to Columbia, 1899. Sold to Imperial Russian Navy as auxiliary cruiser Terek, 1904. Scrapped 1907.
Scandia	1889	Sold to US Army Quartermaster Department, 1898, and renamed USAT Warren. Scrapped 1929.
Normannia	1890	Sold to Spanish Navy, 1898, and renamed Patriota. Scrapped as Compagnie Générale Transatlantique's L'Aquitaine, 1906.
Fürst Bismarck	1891	Sold to Imperial Russian Navy, 1904, and converted into auxiliary cruiser Don. Scrapped as Regia Marina's San Giusto, 1924
Georgia	1891	Sold to Housatonic Steamship Corporation and renamed Housatonic, 1915. Torpedoed and sunk 1917.
Sicilia / Stubbenhuk	1892	Built 1890 for Hansa Line. Acquired by HAPAG during merger with Hansa. Renamed Sicilia, 1894. Sold to Shinyei Kisen Goshi Kaisha and renamed Komagata Maru, 1913. Wrecked as Kabafuto Kisen KK's Heian Maru, 1926.
Persia	1894	Sold to British Transport Company and renamed Minnewaska, 1897. Scrapped as USAT Thomas, 1929.
Ceres / Suevia	1896	Renamed Suevia, 1898. Seized by United States Shipping Board, 1917, and renamed Wachusett. Scrapped 1924.
Valdivia	1896	Built 1886 as Tijuca for Hamburg Süd. Bought by HAPAG and renamed Valdivia, 1896. Sold to Peter R Hinsch of Hamburg and renamed Tom G Corpi. Scrapped as Flandre, 1927.
Pennsylvania	1897	Seized by United States Shipping Board, 1917, and renamed Nansemond. Scrapped 1924.
Arcadia	1897	Seized by United States Shipping Board, 1917. Sold to California Steamship Company, 1923. Scrapped 1927
Pretoria	1898	Surrendered to US government, 1919, then transferred to British government. Scrapped 1921.
Bulgaria	1898 (1913)	Sold to Unione Austriaca di Navigazione and renamed Canada, 1913. Returned to HAPAG and reverted to Bulgaria later that same year. Seized by United States Shipping Board, 1917, and renamed USAT Hercules and later USAT Philippines. Scrapped 1924.
Titania	1898	Built 1879 for Adamson & Ronaldson as Mercedes. Bought by HAPAG from Hamburg Pacific Dampfschiffs Linie. Sold 1898. Sunk as USS Marcellus, 1910.
Sibiria	1898	Built as Hertha for Kingsin Line, 1894. Sold to HAPAG, 1898. Sold to Atlantic Fruit Company, 1915. Wrecked 1916.
Graf Waldersee	1899	Laid down as Pavia, but renamed Graf Waldersee during construction. Surrendered to US government, 1919. Transferred to Britain later that year, and scrapped 1922.
Patricia	1899	Surrendered to US government, 1919. Transferred to Britain later that year, and scrapped 1921.
Hamburg	1899	Chartered by American Red Cross and renamed Red Cross, 1914. Seized by United States Shipping Board, 1917, and later renamed Powhatan. Scrapped as Dollar Line's President Fillmore, 1928.
Saxonia	1899	Seized by United States Shipping Board, 1917, and renamed Savannah. Scrapped as Orbis, 1954.
Kaiser Friedrich	1899	Built 1898 for North German Lloyd. Chartered by HAPAG, 1899. Bought by Compagnie de Navigation Sud-Atlantique, 1912. Sunk 1916.
Deutschland / Viktoria Luise / Hansa	1900	Renamed Viktoria Luise, 1910. Rebuilt and renamed Hansa, 1921. Scrapped 1925.
Kiautschou	1900	Traded to North German Lloyd, 1904. Caught fire as LASSCO's City of Honolulu, 1930, and subsequently scrapped.
Abessinia	1900	Interned in Chile in World War I. Wrecked 1921.
Prinzessin Victoria Luise	1901	Struck reef and sank, 1906.
Athen	1901	Built 1893 for A. C. de Freitas & Co. Sold to HAPAG, 1901. Sold to Gätjens & Jarke, 1903. Sunk 1906.
Arabia	1901	Launched as Liddesdale for Mackil R. & Co., 1901. Purchased by HAPAG during construction. Seized by the British, 1919. Wrecked as Andrios, 1926.
Moltke	1902	Seized by Italian government, 1915. Transferred to Lloyd Sabaudo and renamed Pesaro, 1919. Scrapped 1925.
Prinz Eitel Friedrich	1902	Seized by United States Shipping Board, 1917, and renamed Otsego. Hulked or scrapped as Far Eastern Steamship Company's Dolinsk, 1955.
Blücher	1902	Seized by Brazilian government, 1917, and renamed Leopoldina. Sold to Compagnie Générale Transatlantique and renamed Suffren, 1923. Scrapped 1929.
Prinz Waldemar	1902	Struck reef and sank, 1907.
Prinz Sigismund	1903	Seized by United States Shipping Board, 1917, and renamed General W.C. Gorgas. Scrapped as Mikhail Lomonosov, 1958.
Prinz Adalbert	1903	Seized by Britain, 1914, and used as accommodation ship Prince and later Princetown. Sunk by torpedo as Compagnie de Navigation Sud Atlantique's Alésia, 1917.
Prinz August Wilhelm	1903	Scuttled 1918.
Prinz Oskar	1903	Seized by United States Shipping Board, 1917. Renamed Orion. Scrapped 1930.
Prinz Joachim	1903	Seized by United States Shipping Board, 1917, and renamed Moccasin.
Odenwald	1904	Seized by United States Shipping Board, 1917, and renamed Newport News. Scrapped 1925.
Rhaetia	1905	Seized by United States Shipping Board, 1917, and renamed Black Hawk and later Black Arrow. Scrapped 1924.
Fürst Bismarck / Friedrichsruh	1905	Renamed Friedrichsruh, 1914. Surrendered to Britain, 1919. Sailed under French flag as Amboise. Scrapped 1935.
Karlsruhe	1905	Sold to Ernst Russ Reederei, 1935. Sunk by air attack, 1945.
Präsident	1905	Seized by United States Shipping Board, 1917, and renamed USS Kittery. Scrapped 1933
Amerika	1905	Seized by United States Shipping Board, 1917, and subsequently renamed America, then ceded to United States Mail Steamship Company and later United States Lines. Scrapped as USAT Edmund B. Alexander, 1957.
Kronprinzessin Cecilie	1906	Seized by British government, 1915, and renamed HMS Princess. Paid off 1917.
Kaiserin Auguste Victoria	1906	Surrendered to Britain, 1919. Ceded to Canadian Pacific Steamship Company and renamed Empress of Scotland, 1921. Scrapped 1930.
Pisa	1907 (Chartered 1903)	Built 1896 for Sloman Line. Chartered from Sloman in 1903 before being bought outright by HAPAG in 1907. Seized by United States Shipping Board, 1917, and renamed Ascutney. Scrapped 1924.
President Lincoln	1907	Seized by United States Shipping Board, 1917. Torpedoed and sunk, 1918.
President Grant	1907	Built 1903 as Servian for Wilson & Furness-Leyland Line. Purchased by HAPAG, 1907. Seized by United States Shipping Board, 1917. Renamed Republic, 1920. Transferred to United States Lines, 1924. Scrapped as USAT Republic, 1952.
König Wilhelm II	1907	Seized by United States Shipping Board, 1917, and renamed USS Madawaska. Scrapped as USS U.S. Grant, 1948.
Ypiranga	1908	Surrendered to Britain, 1919. Transferred to Anchor Line and renamed Assyria, 1921. Sank en route to scrappers as Colonial, 1950.
Corcovado	1908	Surrendered to France, 1919. Sold to Italy 1920, to Portugal 1930, and renamed Mouzinho. Scrapped in 1954.
Westerwald	1908	Seized by Portugal, 1916, and renamed Lima. Scrapped in 1969.
Spreewald	1908	Captured by the Royal Navy, 1914. Renamed Lucia. Scrapped in 1951.
Frankenwald	1908	Surrendered to France, 1919, and renamed Tadla. Sold to Turkey, 1934, and renamed Tari. Scrapped in 1967.
Cleveland	1909 (1926)	Seized by United States Shipping Board, 1917, and renamed USS Mobile. Sailed as King Alexander for Byron Steamship Company and as Cleveland for United American Lines before being transferred back to HAPAG in merger with UAL, 1926. Scrapped 1933.
Cincinnati	1909	Seized by United States Shipping Board, 1917, and renamed USS Covington. Torpedoed and sunk 1918.
Grunewald	1912	Seized by United States Shipping Board, 1917, and renamed General G. W. Goethals. Sold to Panama Railway Company, 1920. Bought by Munson Steamship Line, 1926, and renamed Munorleans. Scrapped 1936.
Wasgenwald / Grunewald	1912 (1926)	Sold to Kerr Steamship Company and renamed Shoshone, 1917. Later sailed as USS Shoshone for US Navy and Manoa for Canada Steamship Lines. Bought back by HAPAG and renamed Grunewald, 1926. Scrapped 1933.
Prussia	1912	Seized by Brazil in 1917 and renamed Cabedello. Missing at sea, 1942.
Imperator	1913	Surrendered to US government, 1919. Transferred to Cunard Line and renamed Berengaria, 1921. Sold for scrap, 1938.
Bohemia	1913	Built 1902 as Iowa for White Diamond Steamship Company. Bought from Furness Withy, 1913. Seized by United States Shipping Board, 1917, and renamed Artemis. Transferred to British government and renamed Empire Bittern, 1941. Scuttled as blockship, 1944.
Königin Luise	1913	Sunk 1914
Vaterland	1914	Seized by United States Shipping Board, 1917, and renamed Leviathan. Operated by United States Lines. Sold for scrap, 1937.
Vogtland	n/a (launched 1916)	Launched 1916. Seized by British Government before she could enter service, 1919. Transferred to New Zealand Shipping Company and renamed Cambridge, 1919. Sunk 1940.
Rhineland / Friesland	1920	Launched as Rhineland and renamed Friesland during fitting out. Ceded to British government, 1920. Transferred to Federal Steamship Navigation Company and renamed Hertford, 1922. Torpedoed and sunk, 1942.
Bismarck	n/a (launched 1914)	Launched 1914. Surrendered to British government while incomplete. Transferred to White Star Line and renamed Majestic, 1922. Caught fire as HMS Caledonia, 1939, and subsequently scrapped.
Hagen	1921	Seized by South African Government, 1939. Transferred to UK and renamed Empire Success. Scuttled 1948.
Schwarzwald	1921	Sold to H. Vogemann, 1935. Seized by Royal Navy, 1939, and renamed Empire Mariner. Scrapped, 1964
Spreewald / Anubis	1922	Renamed Anubis, 1935. Reverted to Spreewald, 1940. Torpedoed and sunk in friendly fire incident, 1942.
Arcadia	1922	Sold to Kohlen-Import und Poseidon Schiffahrt and renamed Elbing, 1934. Wrecked as Francisco Morazan, 1960.
Ambria	1922	Sold to Deutsche Levant Linie, 1928. Scrapped as Malay, 1961.
Cattaro	1922	Sold to Bugsier Reederei & Bergungs AG, 1930, and renamed Finkenau. Wrecked as Frontier, 1957.
Thuringia / General San Martin	1922	Chartered by Hamburg Süd, 1934 before being sold outright to them, 1936. Scrapped as Empire Deben, 1955.
Albert Ballin / Hansa	1923	Renamed Hansa, 1935. Struck a mine and sank, 1945. Raised and refitted by Soviet Union as Sovetsky Soyuz around 1949. Scrapped as Tobolsk, 1982.
Deutschland	1924	Sunk by air attack, 1945. Wreck raised and scrapped, 1949.
Saarland	1924	Sold to Japanese Imperial Steamship Co., and renamed Teiyo Maru, 1940. Sunk 1943.
William O'Swald / Resolute	1926 (launched 1914)	Launched 1915 as HAPAG's William O'Swald. Sold incomplete to Koninklijke Rotterdamsche Lloyd and renamed Brabantia, 1916. Transferred to United American Lines and renamed Resolute, 1922. Re-acquired in merger with HAPAG, 1926. Sold to Italian Line and renamed Lombardia, 1935. Sunk by air raid, 1943, and subsequently scrapped.
Reliance / Johann Heinrich Burchard	1926 (launched 1915)	Launched 1915 as HAPAG's Johann Heinrich Burchard, then placed in lay-up. Sold to Koninklijke Hollandsche Lloyd and renamed Limburgia, 1916. Transferred to United American Lines and renamed Reliance, 1922. Re-acquired in merger with HAPAG, 1926. Damaged by fire, 1938, and subsequently scrapped.
Gera	1926	Launched 1923 for German Australian Line. Acquired by HAPAG, 1926. Seized by Britain and renamed Empire Indus. Sunk as Pan Ocean, 1958.
Hamburg	1926	Struck a mine and sunk, 1945. Raised by Soviets and converted to whaler Yuri Dolgoruki, 1950-1960. Scrapped 1977.
New York	1927	Sunk 1945.
Oceana	1927	Built 1913 as Sierra Salvada. Acquired from Società Servizi Marittimi by HAPAG, and renamed Oceana, 1927. Seized by British and renamed Empire Tarne, 1945. Scrapped as Sibir, 1963.
Kulmerland	1928	Scuttled 1944. Subsequently raised and scrapped.
Seattle	1928	Sunk 1940.
Palatia	1928	Sold to Soviet Union and renamed Khasan, 1940. Captured by Kriegsmarine and reverted to Palatia, 1941. Sunk by air attack, 1942.
Milwaukee	1929	Surrendered to Britain and renamed Empire Waveney, 1945. Caught fire, 1946, and subsequently scrapped.
St. Louis	1929	Damaged by air raid, 1944. Subsequently repaired and used as a hotel ship. Scrapped 1952.
Kurmark	1930	Requisitioned by Kriegsmarine and converted into auxiliary cruiser Orion. Sunk by air raid, 1945.
Neumark	1930	Requisitioned by Kriegsmarine and converted into auxiliary cruiser Widder. Wrecked as Fechenheim, 1955.
Potsdam	n/a (launched 1935)	Launched for HAPAG, 1935, before being sold to Norddeutscher Lloyd before completion. Scrapped as Pan-Islamic Steamship Company's Safina-E-Hujjaj, 1976.
Antilla	1939	Scuttled 1940.
Arauca	1939	Seized by United States Maritime Commission and contracted to South Atlantic Steamship Company as Sting, 1941. Delivered to US Navy and renamed Saturn, 1942. Scrapped 1972.
Orizaba	1939	Wrecked off Norway, 1940.
Vaterland	n/a (launched 1940)	Launched 1940, then laid up incomplete. Heavily damaged in air raid, 1943, and scrapped by 1948.
Cuxhaven	1943	Seized by United States, 1945. Sunk as Danish-flagged Inger Skou, 1952.
Millerntor	1943	Seized by British, 1945, and renamed Empire Lune. Scrapped as Sapho I, 1970.
Wilhelmshafen	1943	Seized by British, 1945, and renamed Empire Douglas. Scrapped as Korsun Shevtshenkovsky, 1972.
Homeland	1951	Built as Virginian, 1904. Chartered by HAPAG from Home Lines, 1951. Scrapped 1955.

== See also ==
- Holland America Line
- Norwegian America Line
- Scandinavian America Line
- Swedish American Line
- SS Cleveland
- SS Hertford
- SS Imperator
- USS President Lincoln
