= A. C. de Freitas & Co. =

- Company type: Company
- Industry: Trading and shipping
- Founded: 1835
- Founder: Augusto Constantino de Freitas
- Successor: Augusto de Freitas GmbH
- Headquarters: Hamburg
- Area served: Great Britain, South America and the Mediterranean

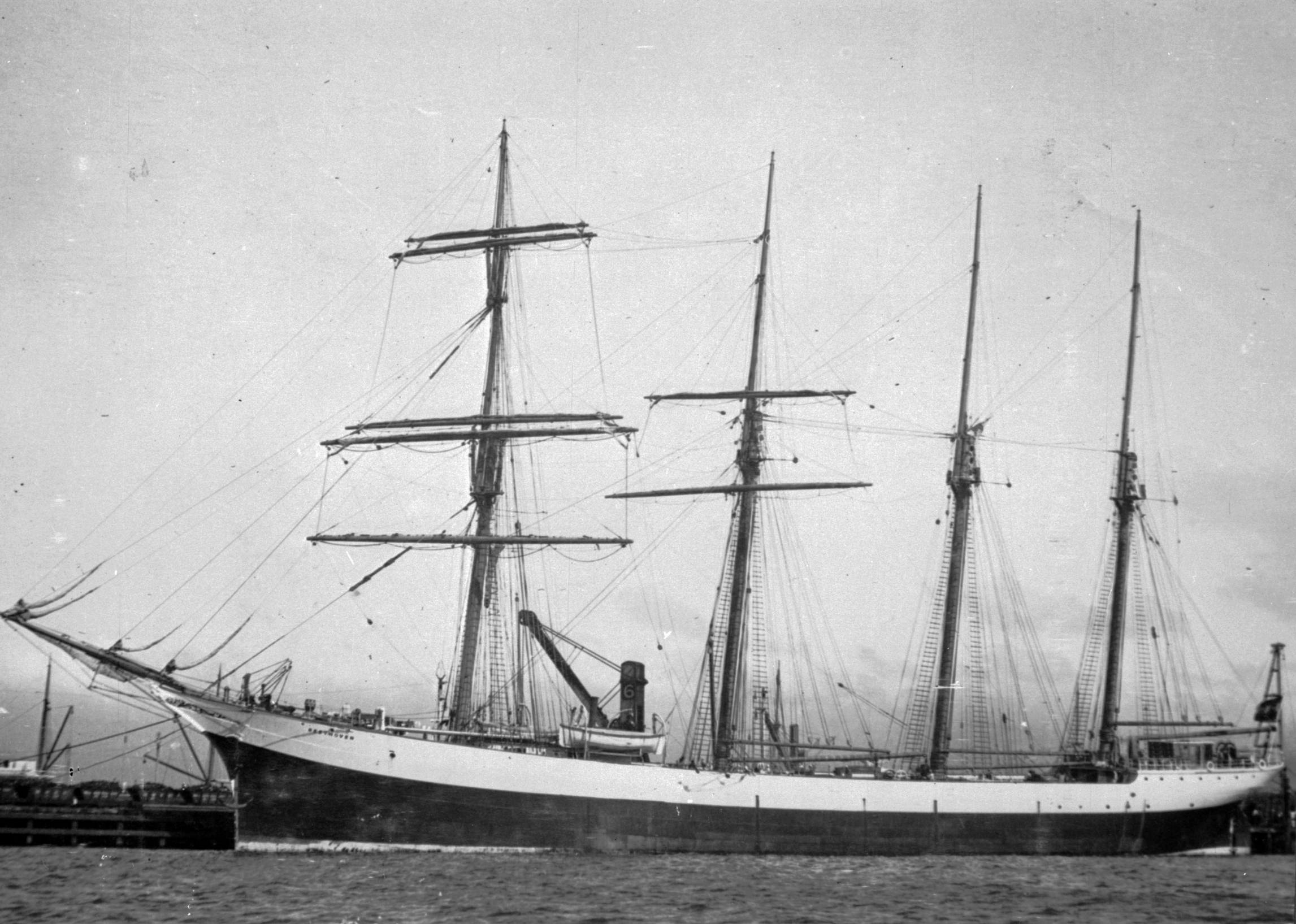
"BEETHOVEN. Four masted barquentine (barkentine) at wharf."

A. C. de Freitas & Co. was, at the end of the 19th century, one of the largest privately owned trading and shipping companies in Hamburg. Its failure to list as a public company was the main reason for its downfall a decade later.

Augusto Constantino de Freitas founded the company in 1835. From its beginnings with sailing ships that carried goods on their own account, the company developed into a large enterprise with extensive interests in Great Britain, South America and the Mediterranean. In 1879, steamships replaced the small fleet of sailing ships. In 1884, a regular scheduled service began into the Adriatic Sea and in 1892 there was a growing fleet of steamers to southern Brazil and Argentina. In 1900, Albert Ballin bought the 14 steamships employed in the South American trade for the Hamburg America Line. The end of the shipping arm of the company came in 1911 with the sale of the six steam ships used in the Mediterranean Sea to Deutsche Levante Linie. The same year also saw the two large sailing vessels, Beethoven and Mozart, sold off. A diminishing trade in goods continued under the name of Augusto de Freitas GmbH.
