= Prinzessin Victoria Luise =

Pioneer cruise ship

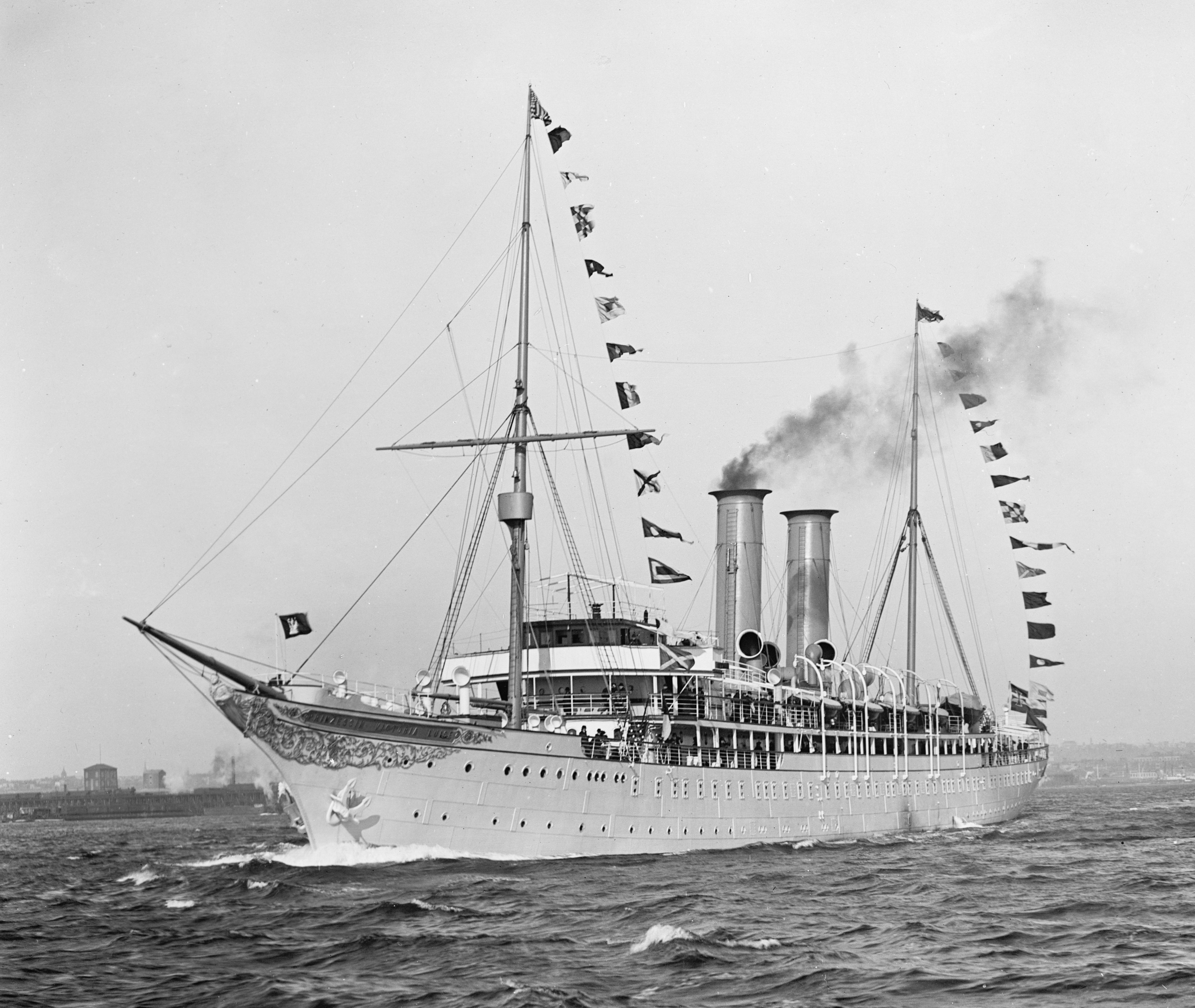
- Prinzessin Victoria Luise dressed overall

History

Germany
- Name: Prinzessin Victoria Luise
- Namesake: Princess Victoria Louise of Prussia
- Owner: Hamburg America Line
- Port of registry: Hamburg
- Builder: Blohm+Voss, Hamburg
- Yard number: 144
- Launched: 29 June 1900
- Completed: 19 December 1900
- Maiden voyage: 5 January 1901
- Identification: code letters RLVT
- Fate: Wrecked off southern Jamaica, 16 December 1906

General characteristics
- Type: cruise ship
- Tonnage: 4,409 GRT, 2,249 NRT, 1,480 DWT
- Length: 407.5 ft (124.2 m)
- Beam: 47.2 ft (14.4 m)
- Depth: 27.0 ft (8.2 m)
- Decks: 2
- Installed power: 391 NHP
- Propulsion: 2 × quadruple-expansion engines; 2 × screws
- Sail plan: 2 masts
- Speed: 16 knots (30 km/h)
- Capacity: 200 1st-class passengers
- Crew: 161

Prinzessin Victoria Luise was the world's first purpose-built cruise ship. She was built in Germany, and launched in 1900 for the Hamburg America Line (HAPAG).

Most of her cruises were from Hoboken, New Jersey to the Caribbean. She also cruised to the Mediterranean and the Black Sea, and in mid 1903 she made a series of cruises from Hamburg to Norway and the Baltic. Between September 1904 and January 1905 she made a pioneering round-the-World cruise from Hamburg to San Francisco.

As a prestigious luxury ship, Prinzessin Victoria Luise also took part in events honoring Kaiser Wilhelm II, his brother Prince Henry of Prussia, and Cipriano Castro, President of Venezuela.

Her career lasted only six years. In 1906 her master mistook one lighthouse for another, set the wrong course, and accidentally drove her onto a reef off Jamaica. He swiftly took his own life, leaving his officers to manage the safe rescue of the ship's passengers and crew. No other lives were lost.

== Background ==
In 1886 Albert Ballin joined HAPAG as manager of its passenger department. Transatlantic passenger traffic was seasonal, as passengers preferred to avoid the weather of the North Atlantic in winter. This left some transatlantic liners under-employed in winter. In 1889 HAPAG's new flagship, Augusta Victoria, entered service. In January 1891 Ballin, despite criticism from his HAPAG fellow directors and from other steamship companies, sent Augusta Victoria on a 58-day "pleasure voyage" from Cuxhaven, Germany to the Mediterranean and Near East. The cruise included well-planned excursions ashore at ports of call en route. Ballin himself was a passenger. The voyage was a success, so similar ones were planned.

Early cruises, called "excursions", were a success, but ocean liners were not ideal for the task. They had too few amenities aboard to occupy passengers on long voyages. They were multi-class ships, with large steerage accommodation unsuited to cruising. Divisions between first and second class divided and limited access to deck space. What deck space there was mostly sheltered, designed to protect passengers from North Atlantic weather. Some of the ports that tourists might like to visit could not accommodate liners as big as Augusta Victoria. Ballin saw that a ship designed specifically for cruising would be more suitable, and also that she could spend all year cruising.

== Building ==
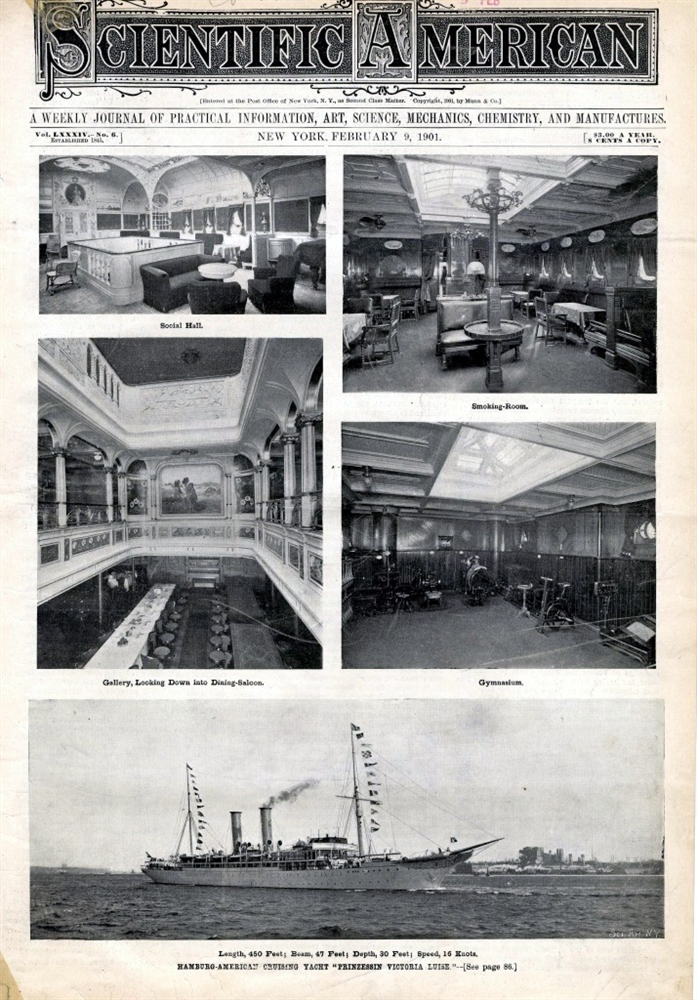
Scientific American cover for 9 February 1901 showing interior and exterior photographs of the ship

In 1899 HAPAG made Ballin its managing director. He soon ordered a cruise ship from Blohm+Voss in Hamburg. She was built as yard number 144, and launched on 29 June 1900 as Prinzessin Victoria Luise, named after Princess Victoria Louise of Prussia, the only daughter of Kaiser Wilhelm II. She was completed on 19 December that year.

Prinzessin Victoria Luise was no bigger than an average ocean-going cargo ship of her era. Her registered length was 407.5 ft (124.2 m), her beam was 47.2 ft (14.4 m), and her depth was 27.0 ft (8.2 m). Her tonnages were 4,409 gross register tons (GRT), 2,249 net register tons (NRT), and 1,480 tons deadweight (DWT). But she was styled to look like a luxury private steam yacht, with a white hull and raked clipper bow and bowsprit, instead of the black hull and straight stem that was then fashionable for most steamships. Her lifeboats were varnished mahogany. She had a likeness of her namesake as a figurehead.

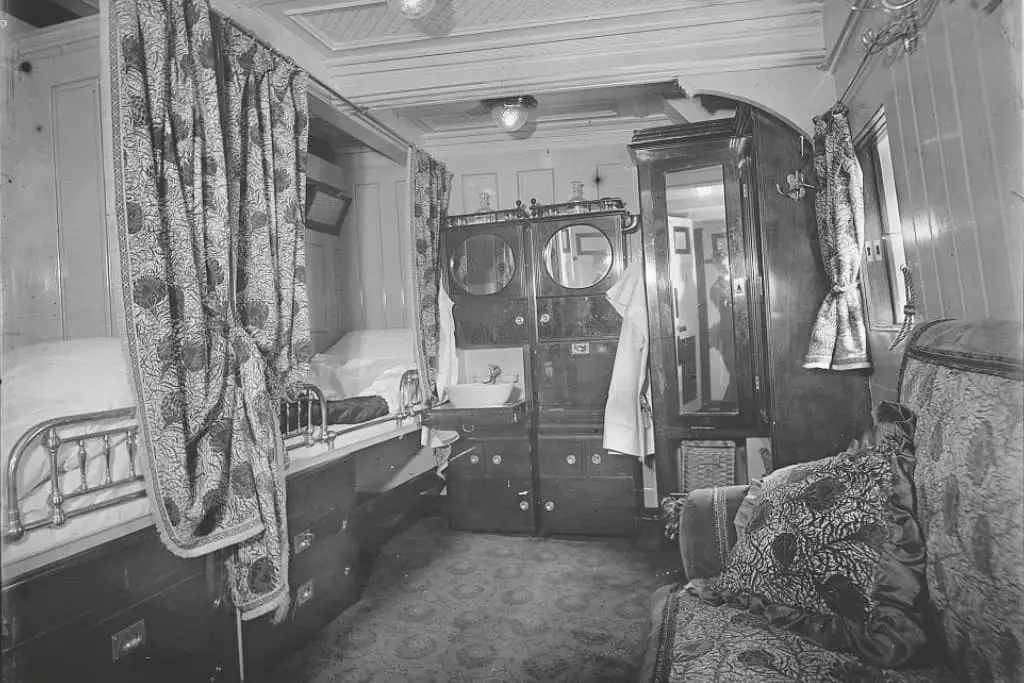
Inside one of Prinzessin Victoria Luise's passenger state rooms

Prinzessin Victoria Luise was a one-class ship. All of her 120 cabins were first class state rooms. Her public rooms included a ballroom, social hall, gymnasium, library, and smoking room. A luxurious art gallery surrounded her dining room. She even had a darkroom for amateur photographers. Ballin aimed to match the style and service of Europe's finest hotels.

The ship had twin screws, each driven by a quadruple-expansion engine. The combined power of her twin engines was rated at 391 nominal horsepower and gave her a speed of 16 knots (30 km/h; 18 mph). She had two funnels, painted buff. The after one may have been a dummy.

After she was fitted out, Wilhelm II inspected the ship. He was said to be displeased that she was slightly longer than his imperial yacht Hohenzollern. HAPAG registered Prinzessin Victoria Luise at Hamburg. Her code letters were RLVT.

== Career ==
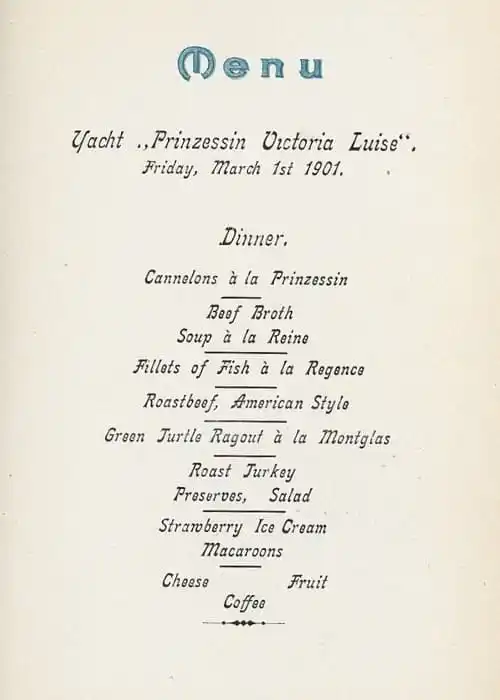
Prinzessin Victoria Luise's menu for 1 March 1901

On 5 January 1901 Prinzessin Victoria Luise left Hamburg on her maiden voyage. She called at Boulogne and Plymouth, and reached Hoboken, New Jersey on 17 January. At first, her cruises were sometimes called "tours". On 26 January she left New York on her first tour, which was to Port-au-Prince; Santo Domingo; San Juan; St Thomas, in what were then the Danish West Indies; Saint-Pierre; Port of Spain; La Guaira: Puerto Cabello; Curaçao; Kingston; Santiago de Cuba; Cienfuegos; and Havana. She arrived back in Hoboken on 2 March. On 9 March, she left Hoboken on a her second tour, which was to the Mediterranean and the Black Sea. On 18 June she attended a Norddeutscher Regatta Verein regatta on the Elbe at Cuxhaven, where she hosted a dinner at which Wilhelm II gave a speech in which he praised Ballin as "a bold adventurer to make peaceful conquests, whose fruits our grandchildren will reap". The Kaiser also presented a portrait of himself to Ballin, bearing the dedication "to the farseeing and tireless pathbreaker for our German commerce and export".

In February and March 1902 Prince Henry of Prussia visited the United States. On 11 March, as he left Hoboken aboard Deutschland to return home, the Hudson County Choristers sang to him from the deck of Prinzessin Victoria Luise. Edward VII and Queen Alexandra were due to be crowned in Westminster on 26 June 1902. HAPAG arranged for Prinzessin Victoria Luise to leave New York on 10 June to take passengers to England for the coronation, calling at Le Havre and Hamburg as well as London. However, Edward fell ill, and the coronation was postponed until 9 August.

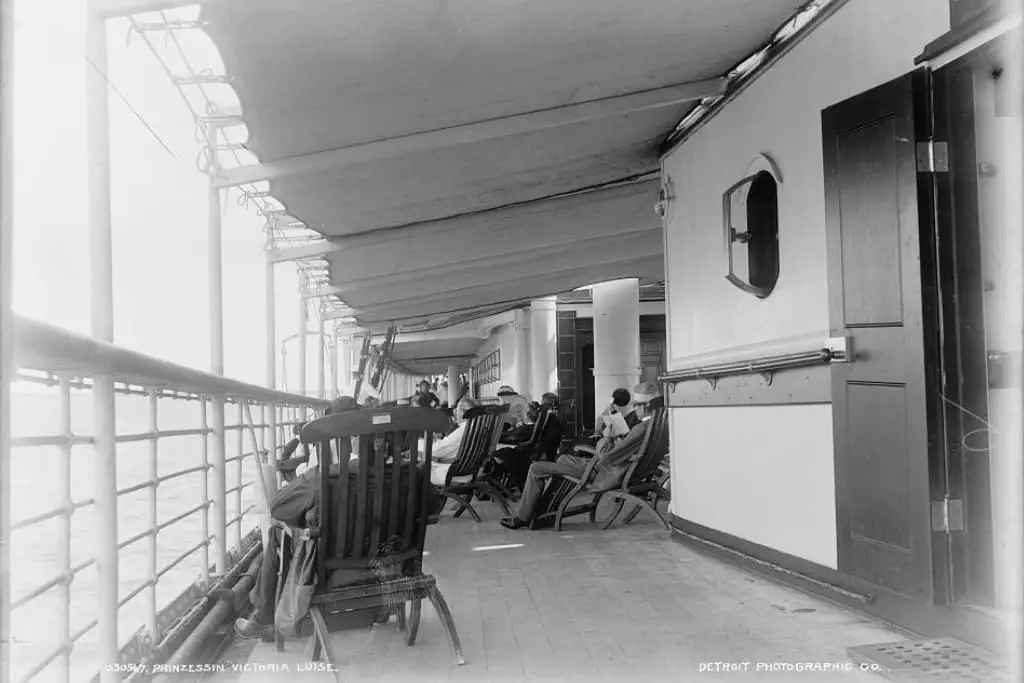
On deck aboard Prinzessin Victoria Luise

In February and March 1903, Prinzessin Victoria Luise made a cruise that visited Bermuda as well as the Caribbean. That summer, HAPAG scheduled her to sail to North Cape and Spitzbergen (now Svalbard) in Norway, and to the Baltic, leaving Hamburg on 6 June, 8 July and 28 July. In September 1903 HAPAG announced that she would make a four-and-a-half month cruise almost the whole way around the World, including a fortnight in Japan. She would start on 13 September 1904, sail eastbound, and end at San Francisco on 26 January 1905. On 12 April 1904 the ship left Hoboken on a cruise to the Mediterranean.

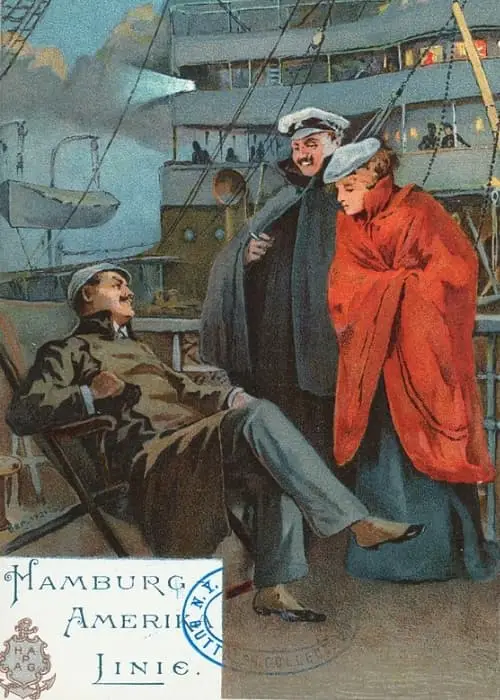
An official HAPAG postcard for passengers

In January 1904, in port in La Guaira, Prinzessin Victoria Luise hosted a reception at which HAPAG company officials entertained President Castro of Venezuela. That May HAPAG revised her round-the-World tour plan. She would start from Hamburg on 25 September, and passengers from the United States could join her via the company's scheduled transatlantic services from New York. Ports of call were to include Lisbon, Gibraltar, Genoa, Piraeus, Istanbul, Jaffa, and Port Said, whence she would pass through the Suez Canal. She would then continue via Bombay (now Mumbai) and Calcutta. Passengers were offered the option to leave the ship at Bombay, make an 18-day overland tour of India, and rejoin her at Calcutta. She was to continue via Singapore, Manila, Hong Kong, Shanghai, Nagasaki, Kobe, and Yokohama. Her intended arrival in San Francisco was brought forward to 17 January 1905. She was to leave San Francisco on 24 January to make her return voyage. The ship would carry a band of musicians to entertain her 200 passengers.

In June 1906 HAPAG announced that it would transfer Prinzessin Victoria Luise to its Atlas Service between Hoboken and the Caribbean, along with the Prinz-class cargo liners Prinz Eitel Friedrich, Prinz Waldemar, Prinz August Wilhelm, and Prinz Joachim. Prinzessin Victoria Luise's route would be between Hoboken and Jamaica. The Prinz-class ships would work the route between Hoboken and Colón via Kingston.

== Loss ==
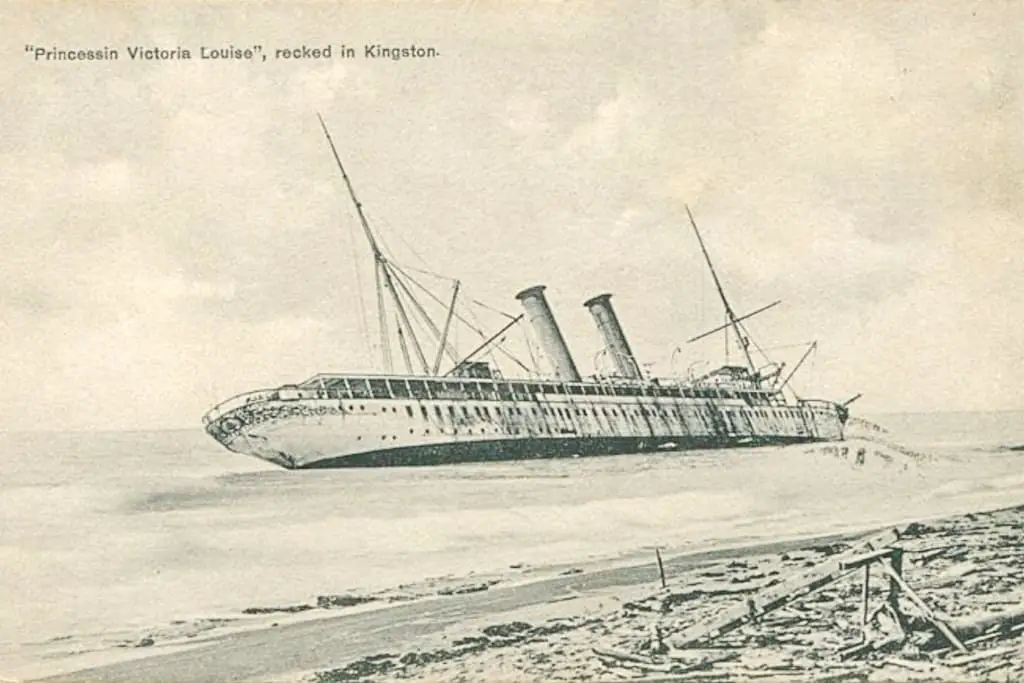
Prinzessin Victoria Luise's wreck on the coast of Jamaica

On 12 December 1906 Prinzessin Victoria Luise left Hoboken for Port Antonio and Kingston. Her master, Captain H Brunswig, was 38 years old, and had been her commander for more than two years.

On the night of 16 December, Brunswig tried to take the ship into Kingston, but he mistook Plumb Point Lighthouse for Port Royal Lighthouse. A recent volcanic eruption had changed the topography of the seabed, so that in places, actual depths differed from what was marked on the ship's nautical charts. Heading north at 14 knots (26 km/h) the ship grounded at about 21:30 hrs on an uncharted reef at position 17°55′40″N 76°51′10″W. Her engines were run full astern, but failed to free her.

Captain Brunswig sent a boat ashore to report the accident, and then retired to his cabin and shot himself. The passengers, unaware of his suicide, stayed aboard overnight. The next morning the Third Officer, Bruno Zache, commanded one of the ship's boats and took it to Plum Point. A continuous line of boats was formed from the ship to the shore, along which the crew passed each passenger from boat to boat to disembark them. Various hotels in Kingston then accommodated the passengers.

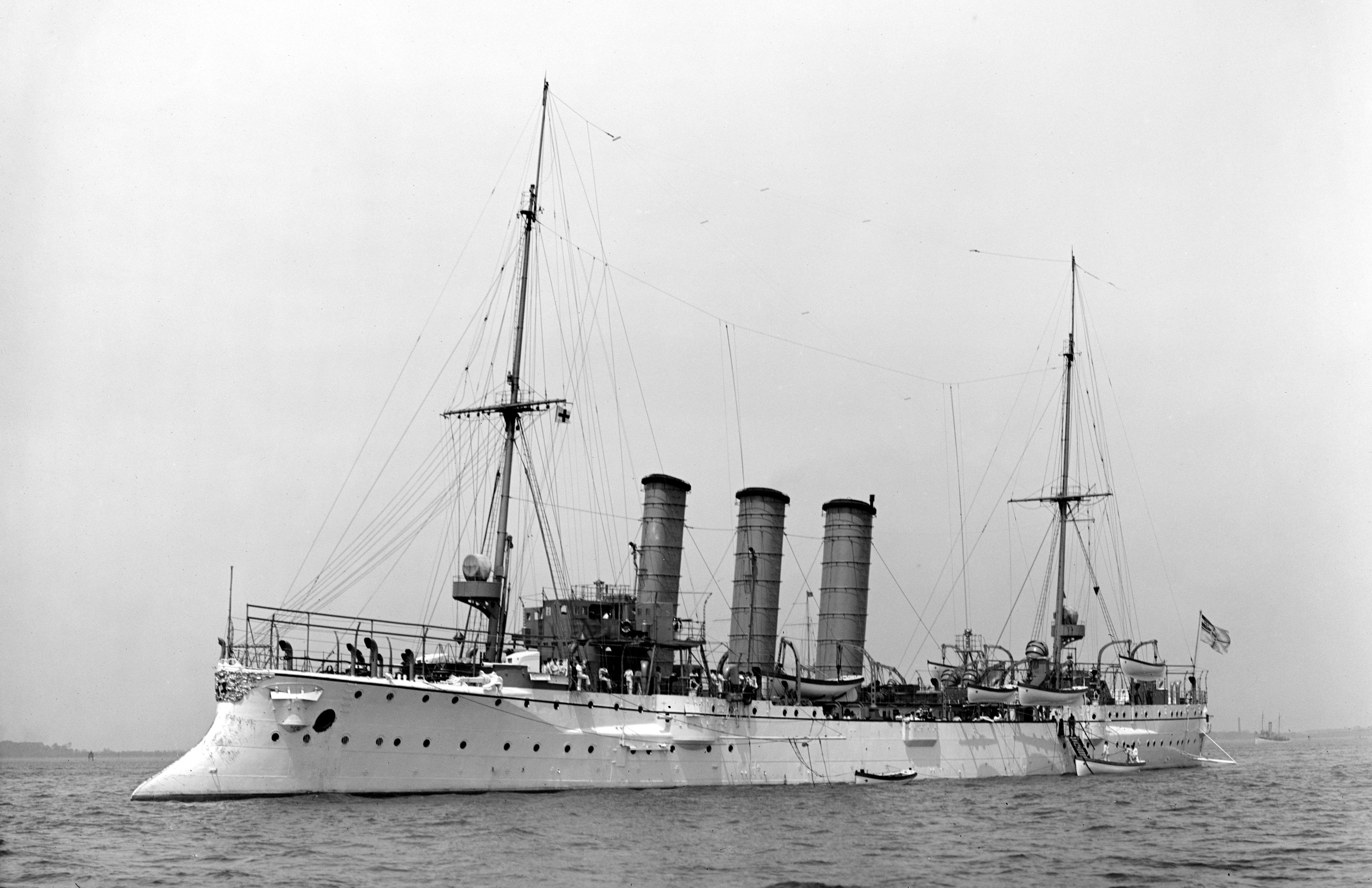
SMS Bremen

The German cruiser SMS Bremen and French training ship Duguay-Trouin came to assist Prinzessin Victoria Luise. Bremen tried to tow her off the rocks, but without success. On 18 December the Merritt & Chapman salvage tug Rescue left Norfolk, Virginia to try to rescue the ship. However, within days the sea, aided by a storm, had turned the ship broadside to the shore, she was listing sharply to port, and the water inside her hull was 16 feet (5 m) deep on that side. Her engines had been displaced, and her frame and keel plates were damaged. On 19 December she was declared a total loss. Some of her fittings were salvaged, and the HAPAG ship Sarnia took them to Hoboken, along with most of her crew. HAPAG transferred the liner Kronprinzessin Cecilie to replace Prinzessin Victoria Luise on its Hoboken – Jamaica route.

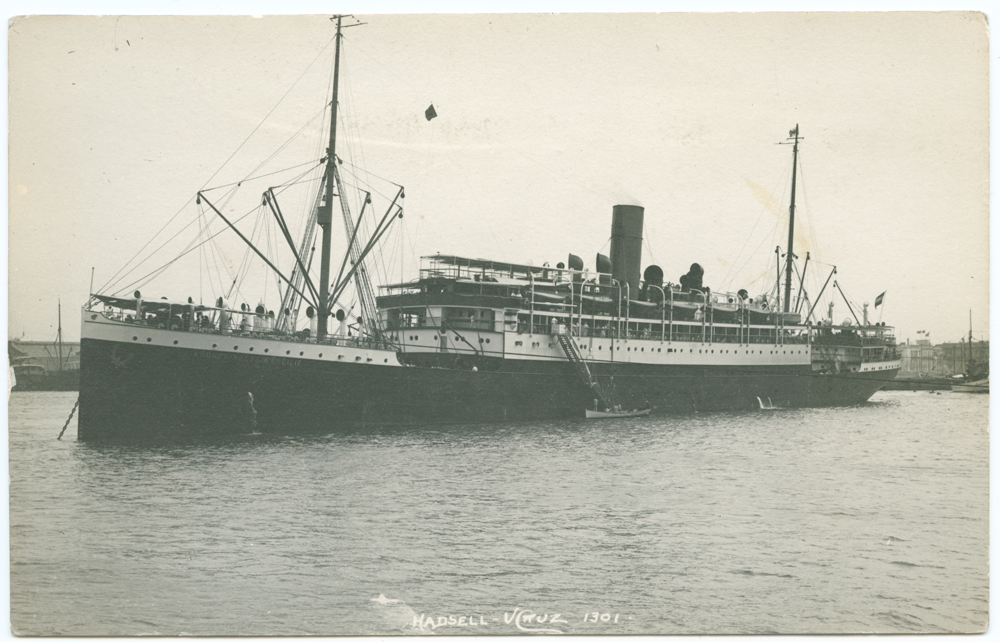
Kronprinzessin Cecilie

Among seafarers there was swift criticism of Brunswig's suicide. In a shipwreck, the master's duty is to remain in command, ensure the safety of his passengers and crew, and try to save his ship. Afterward his duty is to testify to any inquiry into the shipwreck that his employers or the relevant government may convene. Brunswig did none of these things.

On 24 May 1907 an Admiralty court in Hamburg posthumously found Captain Brunswig to have been negligent, not only by mistaking one lighthouse for another, but also for maintaining full speed at the time. Also that year a submarine earthquake sank the wreck of the ship. In 1910 Deutschland was refitted as a cruise ship and renamed Victoria Luise (without the "Prinzessin") to succeed her.

== Bibliography ==
- Austin, Daryl (22 July 2021). "The History of the World's First Cruise Ship Built Solely for Luxurious Travel". Smithsonian.
- Haws, Duncan (1980). The Ships of the Hamburg America, Adler and Carr Lines. Merchant Fleets in Profile. Vol. 4. Cambridge: Patrick Stephens Ltd. ISBN 0-85059-397-2.
- Lloyd's Register of British and Foreign Shipping. Vol. I.–Steamers. London: Lloyd's Register of Shipping. 1902 – via Internet Archive.
- "Tourist Ship Prinzessin Luise a Wreck". The American Marine Engineer. 2 (January, 1907). New York, Chicago: National Marine Engineer's Beneficial Association. 1908.
