= SS Fürst Bismarck (1905) =

German ocean liner

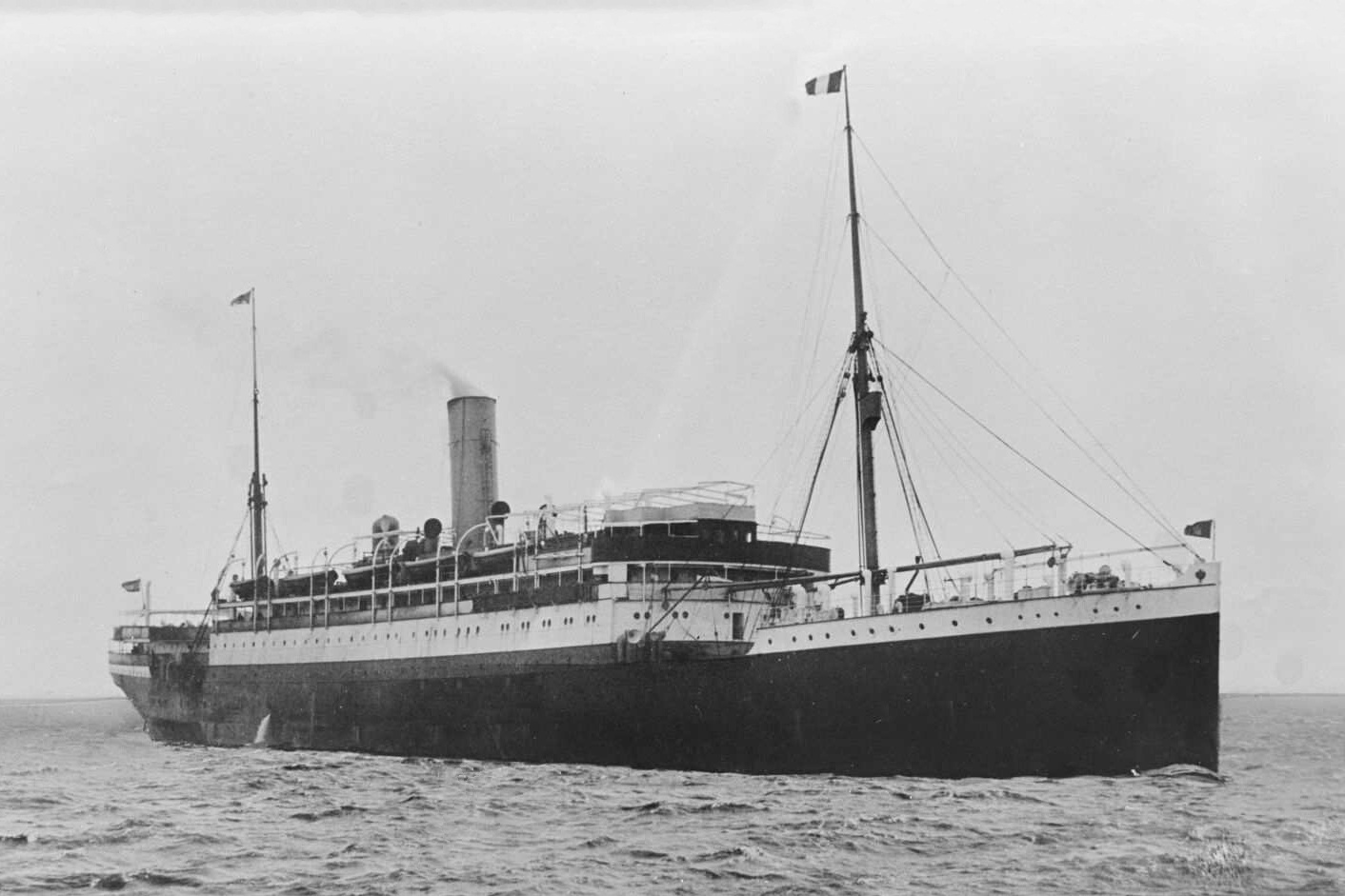
- Fürst Bismarck

History
- Name: 1905: Fürst Bismarck; 1914: Friedrichsruh; 1921: Amboise
- Namesake: 1905: Otto von Bismarck; 1914: Friedrichsruh; 1921: Amboise
- Owner: 1905: Hamburg America Line; 1919: Shipping Controller; 1921: Messageries Maritimes
- Operator: 1919: Orient SN Co
- Port of registry: 1905: (German Empire) Hamburg; 1919: (United Kingdom) London; 1921: (France) Marseille
- Route: 1905: Genoa – Hoboken; 1906: Hamburg – Vera Cruz; 1922: Marseille – Haiphong
- Builder: Fairfield S&E, Govan
- Yard number: 438
- Launched: 22 March 1905
- Completed: 19 June 1905
- Maiden voyage: 19 August 1905, Hamburg – Hoboken
- Refit: 1914
- Identification: 1905: code letters RNQG; 1913: call sign DCI; 1919: UK official number 143195; 1919: code letters JWQB; 1921: code letters OBUK; 1934: call sign: FOAB
- Fate: scrapped 1935

General characteristics
- Type: ocean liner
- Tonnage: 8,332 GRT, 5,067 NRT, 7,480 DWT
- Length: 469.2 ft (143.0 m)
- Beam: 55.1 ft (16.8 m)
- Depth: 29.7 ft (9.1 m)
- Decks: 3
- Installed power: 783 NHP; 6,500 ihp
- Propulsion: 2 × quadruple-expansion engines; 2 × screws
- Speed: 15 knots (28 km/h)
- Capacity: passengers: 243 × 1st class; × 44 × 2nd class; 1,300 × 3rd class
- Crew: 212
- Sensors & processing systems: by 1910: submarine signalling
- Notes: sister ship: Kronprinzessin Cecilie

SS Fürst Bismarck was a Hamburg America Line (HAPAG) ocean liner. She was launched in Scotland in 1905. In 1914 she was renamed Friedrichsruh. In 1919 the United Kingdom seized her as World War I reparations. In 1921 Messageries Maritimes acquired her and renamed her Amboise. She was scrapped in Italy in 1935.

The ship spent much of her HAPAG career on the route between Hamburg and Vera Cruz. For most of her Messageries Maritimes career her route was between Marseille and Haiphong.

She was the second HAPAG ocean liner to be named after Otto von Bismarck. HAPAG's first Fürst Bismarck was launched in 1890 and sold to Russia in 1904.

== Building ==
The ship was the first of a pair of sisters that HAPAG commissioned, one from the Fairfield Shipbuilding and Engineering Company in Glasgow, and the other from Friedrich Krupp Germaniawerft in Kiel. They were laid down as Wettin and Wittelsbach respectively, but launched as Fürst Bismarck and Kronprinzessin Cecilie.

The Fairfield ship was built as yard number 438. She was to have been named Wettin, after either the House of Wettin or that family's Wettin Castle. But she was launched on 22 March 1905 as Fürst Bismarck. Her launch was filmed with a Lumière brothers cinematograph camera. She was completed on 19 June.

Fürst Bismarck's registered length was 469.2 ft (143.0 m), her beam was 55.1 ft (16.8 m) and her depth was 29.7 ft (9.1 m). Her tonnages were 8,332 GRT, 5,067 NRT, and 7,480 DWT. She had five cargo hatches, 12 derricks, and 11 winches. 19,115 cubic feet (541 m^{3}) of her cargo capacity was refrigerated. As built, she had berths for 1,587 passengers: 243 in first class; 44 in second class; and 1,300 in third class. Her passenger facilities included a gymnasium. Charles Rennie Mackintosh designed her interiors.

Fürst Bismarck had twin screws, each driven by a quadruple-expansion engine. The combined power of her twin engines was rated at 783 NHP or 6,500 ihp, and gave her a speed of 15 knots (28 km/h). Her fuel was coal, of which she burned 120 tons a day. She had a crew of 212.

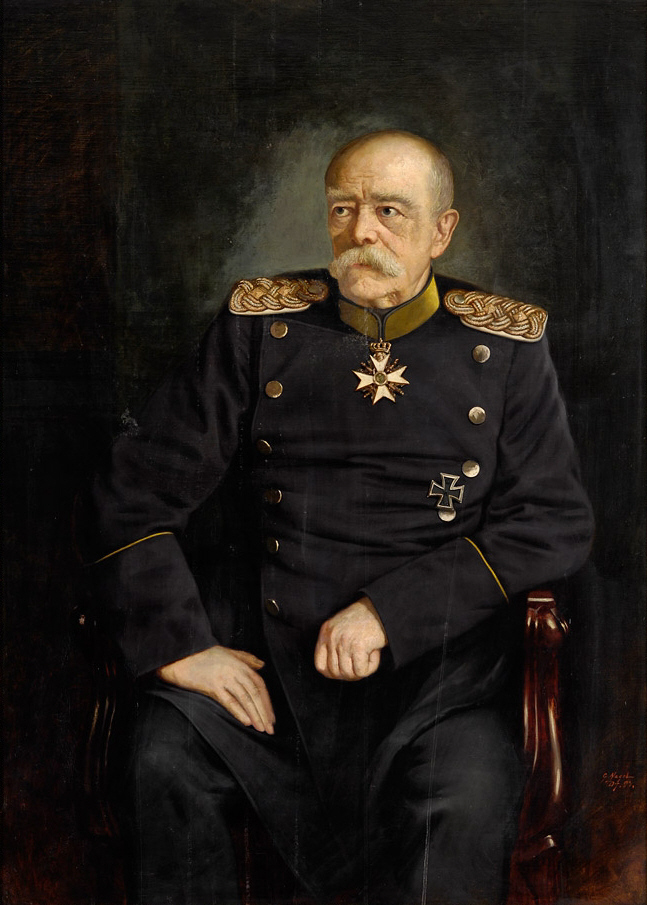
Portrait of Otto von Bismarck, painted in 1894

When she was launched, HAPAG intended Fürst Bismarck to be a floating sanatorium. She was to take convalescents on health cruises, and carry a staff of medical personnel. HAPAG planned her maiden voyage to start on 8 July, and to be a cruise around the British Isles and Norway. However, HAPAG abandoned the idea, and had her completed as a normal ocean liner, intended for its route between Genoa in Italy and Hoboken, New Jersey via Naples and Gibraltar.

== Fürst Bismarck ==
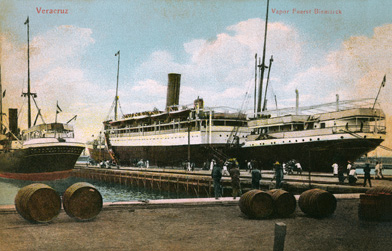
Colourised postcard of Fürst Bismarck in Vera Cruz

HAPAG registered Fürst Bismarck in Hamburg. Her code letters were RNQG. Her maiden voyage was from Hamburg to Hoboken. She left Hamburg on 19 August and reached Hoboken ten days later. That November she landed in Hoboken 48 Sioux who had been performing in France in Buffalo Bill's Wild West show, and were going home to Pine Ridge Indian Reservation.

HAPAG transferred Fürst Bismarck to its route between Italy and Hoboken, and then to its route was between Hamburg and Vera Cruz in Mexico via Havana, Cuba, which she worked with her sister ship Kronprinzessin Cecilie. She left Hamburg on her first voyage on this route on 10 January 1906. Early in 1908 Fürst Bismarck made at least one crossing from Hamburg to Hoboken. On one voyage she left Havana on 21 December 1909, and grounded in fog off Octeville on the Cotentin Peninsula of France on 6 January 1910. Her crew jettisoned part of her cargo, and she was refloated on 8 January. By 1910 she was equipped with submarine signalling and wireless telegraphy.

On 21 January 1912 Fürst Bismarck collided in Kingston, Jamaica when manœuvering to dock. Her bridge had telegraphed to put her engines full astern, but the engineer officer on watch mistook the order for full ahead. She rammed through the Government pier, hit the police wharf, and destroyed the Harbourmaster's launch. The damage to the docks was estimated at $20,000. There were many people on the dock to meet the ship, but none was injured.

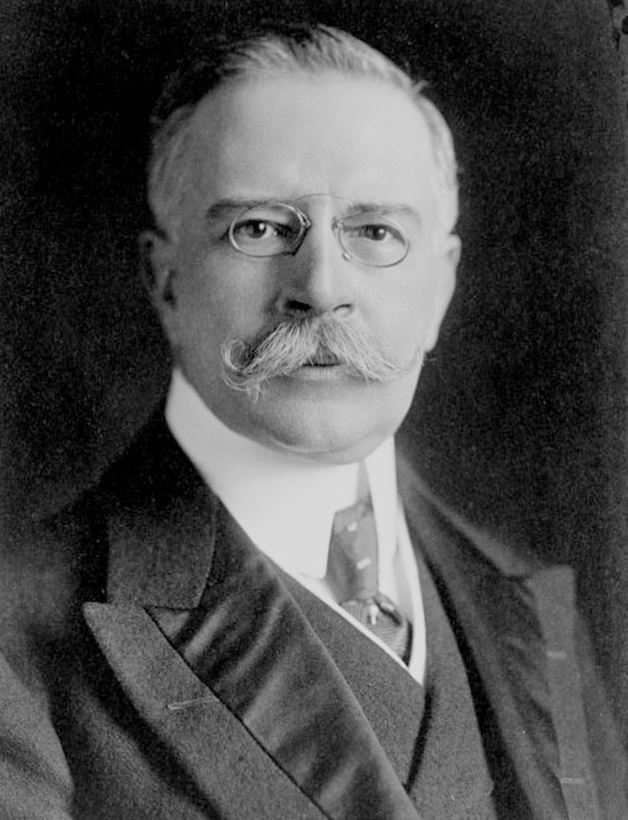
Francisco León de la Barra

In April 1912 Francisco León de la Barra, former President of Mexico, returned from Europe to Vera Cruz aboard her. By 1913 her wireless call sign was DCI.

In January 1914 Fürst Bismarck made a crossing from Hamburg to Boston via Boulogne. She faced continuously stormy weather from 11 to 15 January, one of her hatches was torn off, and part of her steerage passenger accommodation was flooded. She reached Boston on 17 January.

In April 1914 the USA caught the HAPAG ship Ypiranga gun-running for President Victoriano Huerta's army in the Mexican Revolution. After the "Ypiranga incident", the US was suspicious of any unusual activity by HAPAG ships. In May Kronprinzessin Cecilie arrived in Mexico carrying arms, but did not unload them.

On 6 June 1914 Fürst Bismarck arrived in New Orleans. She carried no passengers, and her arrival was unexpected. HAPAG said she was there to load 3,000 tons of "miscellaneous cargo" to take to Vera Cruz and Puerto Mexico (now Coatzacoalcos). It was rumoured that she was there to load arms. An inspection the next day disproved this, but the US government kept her under surveillance. On 9 June she left New Orleans. By 11 June it was rumoured that she would instead evacuate Huerta's family from Mexico.

== Friedrichsruh ==
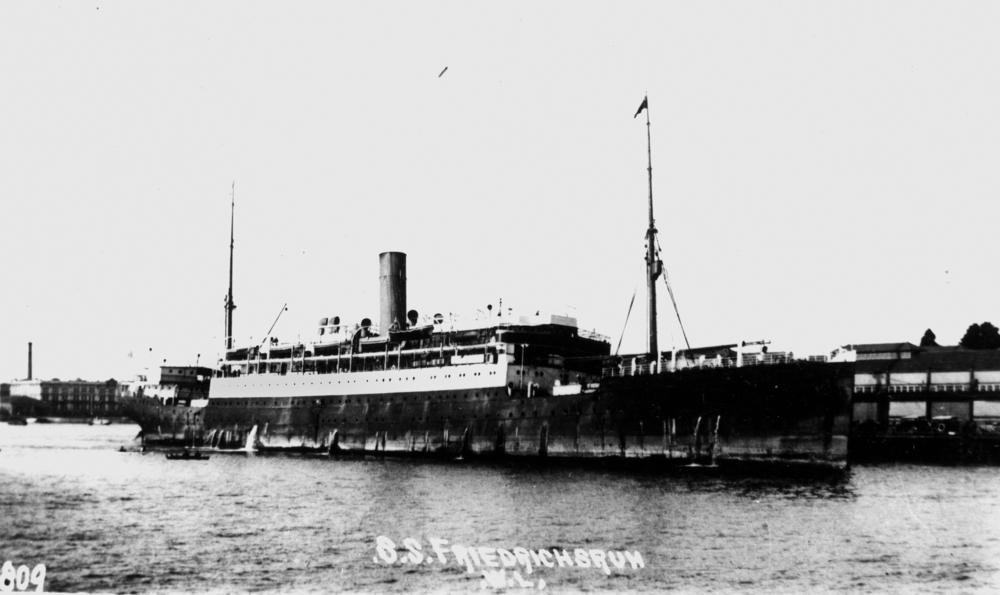
The ship as Friedrichsruh

Later in 1914 Fürst Bismarck was renamed Friedrichsruh, after the family seat of the House of Bismarck. After the First World War began that August she was laid up in Hamburg. Between September and November 1917 she took part in the Oesel Operation in the Baltic.

In 1919 the United Kingdom seized the ship. The Shipping Controller took ownership of her, and appointed the Orient Steam Navigation Company to manage her. She was registered in London. Her UK official number was 143195 and her code letters were JWQB. The UK used her as a troop ship.

== Amboise ==
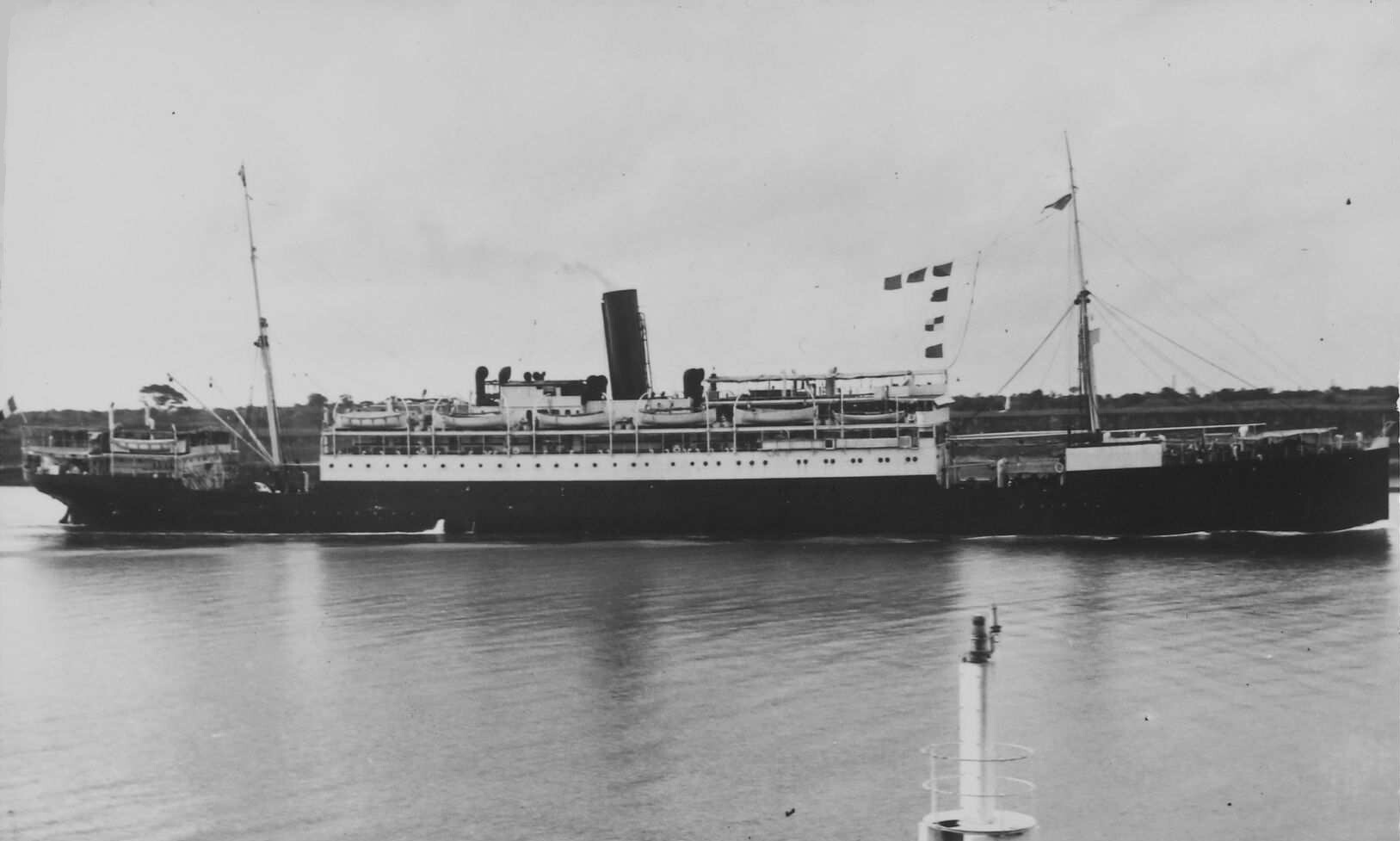
The ship as Amboise, flying her French code letters OBUK

In September 1921 Messageries Maritimes (MM) acquired Friedrichsruh and renamed her Amboise. She was registered in Marseille and her code letters were OBUK. On 27 February 1922 she left Marseille for Haiphong in French Indochina via Saigon. She remained on this route until 1932. Thereafter she sailed occasionally to the Indian Ocean. By 1934 her call sign was FOAB, and this had superseded her code letters. She was scrapped in Genoa in 1935.

== Bibliography ==
- Haws, Duncan (1980). The Ships of the Hamburg America, Adler and Carr Lines. Merchant Fleets in Profile. Vol. 4. Cambridge: Patrick Stephens Ltd. ISBN 0-85059-397-2.
- Lloyd's Register of British and Foreign Shipping. Vol. I.–Steamers. London: Lloyd's Register of Shipping. 1905 – via Internet Archive.
- Lloyd's Register of British and Foreign Shipping. Vol. I.–Steamers. London: Lloyd's Register of Shipping. 1906 – via Internet Archive.
- Lloyd's Register of British and Foreign Shipping. Vol. I.–Steamers. London: Lloyd's Register of Shipping. 1910 – via Internet Archive.
- Lloyd's Register of Shipping. Vol. II.–Steamers. London: Lloyd's Register of Shipping. 1921 – via Internet Archive.
- Lloyd's Register of Shipping. Vol. II.–Steamers and Motor Vessels. London: Lloyd's Register of Shipping. 1922 – via Internet Archive.
- Lloyd's Register of Shipping (PDF). Vol. II.–Steamers and Motorships of 300 tons gross and over. London: Lloyd's Register of Shipping. 1934 – via Southampton City Council.
- The Marconi Press Agency Ltd (1913). The Year Book of Wireless Telegraphy and Telephony. London: The St Katherine Press.
- The Marconi Press Agency Ltd (1914). The Year Book of Wireless Telegraphy and Telephony. London: The Marconi Press Agency Ltd.
- Mercantile Navy List. London. 1920 – via Crew List Index Project.
- Rothe, Klaus (1986). Deutsche Ozean-Passagierschiffe 1896 bis 1918. Bibliothek der Schiffstypen (in German). Berlin: VEB Verlag für Verkehrswesen. ISBN 3-344-00059-4.
