= HMS Ajax (1912) =

UK King George V-class battleship

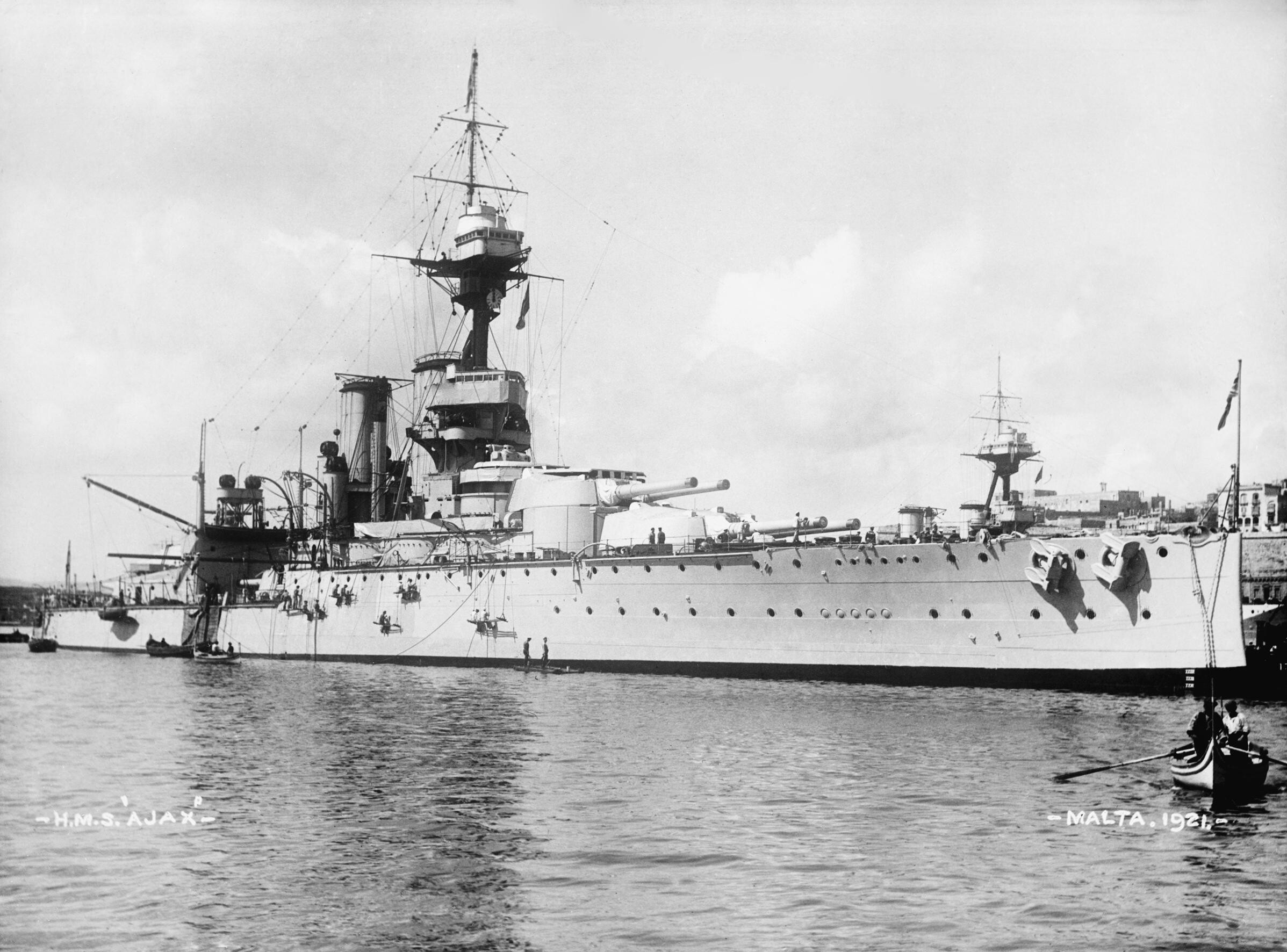
- The crew of the Ajax painting the ship, Grand Harbour, Valletta, Malta, 1921

History

United Kingdom
- Name: Ajax
- Namesake: Ajax
- Builder: Scotts Shipbuilding & Engineering
- Laid down: 27 February 1911
- Launched: 21 March 1912
- Completed: May 1913
- Commissioned: 31 October 1913
- Decommissioned: April 1924
- Out of service: October 1926
- Fate: Sold for scrap, 10 December 1926

General characteristics (as built)
- Class & type: King George V-class dreadnought battleship
- Displacement: 25,420 long tons (25,830 t) (normal)
- Length: 597 ft 9 in (182.2 m) (o/a)
- Beam: 89 ft 1 in (27.2 m)
- Draught: 28 ft 8 in (8.7 m)
- Installed power: 27,000 shp (20,000 kW); 18 × Babcock & Wilcox boilers
- Propulsion: 4 × shafts; 2 × steam turbine sets
- Speed: 21 knots (39 km/h; 24 mph)
- Range: 6,310 nmi (11,690 km; 7,260 mi) at 10 knots (19 km/h; 12 mph)
- Complement: 869 (1914)
- Armament: 5 × twin 13.5 in (343 mm) guns; 16 × single 4 in (102 mm) guns; 3 × 21 in (533 mm) torpedo tubes
- Armour: Belt: 12 in (305 mm); Deck: 1–4 in (25–102 mm); Turrets: 11 in (280 mm); Barbettes: 10 in (254 mm)

HMS Ajax was the third of four King George V-class dreadnought battleships built for the Royal Navy in the early 1910s. After commissioning in 1913, she spent the bulk of her career assigned to the Home and Grand Fleets. Aside from participating in the failed attempt to intercept the German ships that had bombarded Scarborough, Hartlepool and Whitby in late 1914, the Battle of Jutland in May 1916 and the inconclusive action of 19 August, her service during World War I generally consisted of routine patrols and training in the North Sea.

After the war, Ajax was assigned to the Mediterranean Fleet, where she took part in the Allied intervention in the Russian Civil War in the Black Sea in 1919–1920. The ship was deployed to Turkish waters during the Chanak Crisis of September–October 1922. Ajax was placed in reserve in 1924 before being sold for scrap two years later in accordance with the terms of the Washington Naval Treaty.

== Design and description ==
The King George V-class ships were designed as enlarged and improved versions of the preceding Orion-class battleship. They had an overall length of 597 feet 9 inches (182.2 m), a beam of 89 feet 1 inch (27.2 m) and a draught of 28 feet 8 inches (8.7 m). They displaced 25,420 long tons (25,830 t) at normal load and 27,120 long tons (27,560 t) at deep load. Ajax's crew numbered 869 officers and ratings upon completion.

Ships of the King George V class were powered by two sets of Parsons] steam turbines, each driving two shafts, using steam provided by 18 Babcock & Wilcox boilers. The turbines were rated at 27,000 shaft horsepower (20,000 kW) and were intended to give the battleships a speed of 21 knots (39 km/h; 24 mph). During her sea trials on 12–13 May 1913, Ajax reached a maximum speed of 21.2 knots (39.3 km/h; 24.4 mph) from 29,250 shp (21,810 kW). She carried enough coal and fuel oil to give her a range of 6,310 nautical miles (11,690 km; 7,260 mi) at a cruising speed of 10 knots (19 km/h; 12 mph).

=== Armament and armour ===
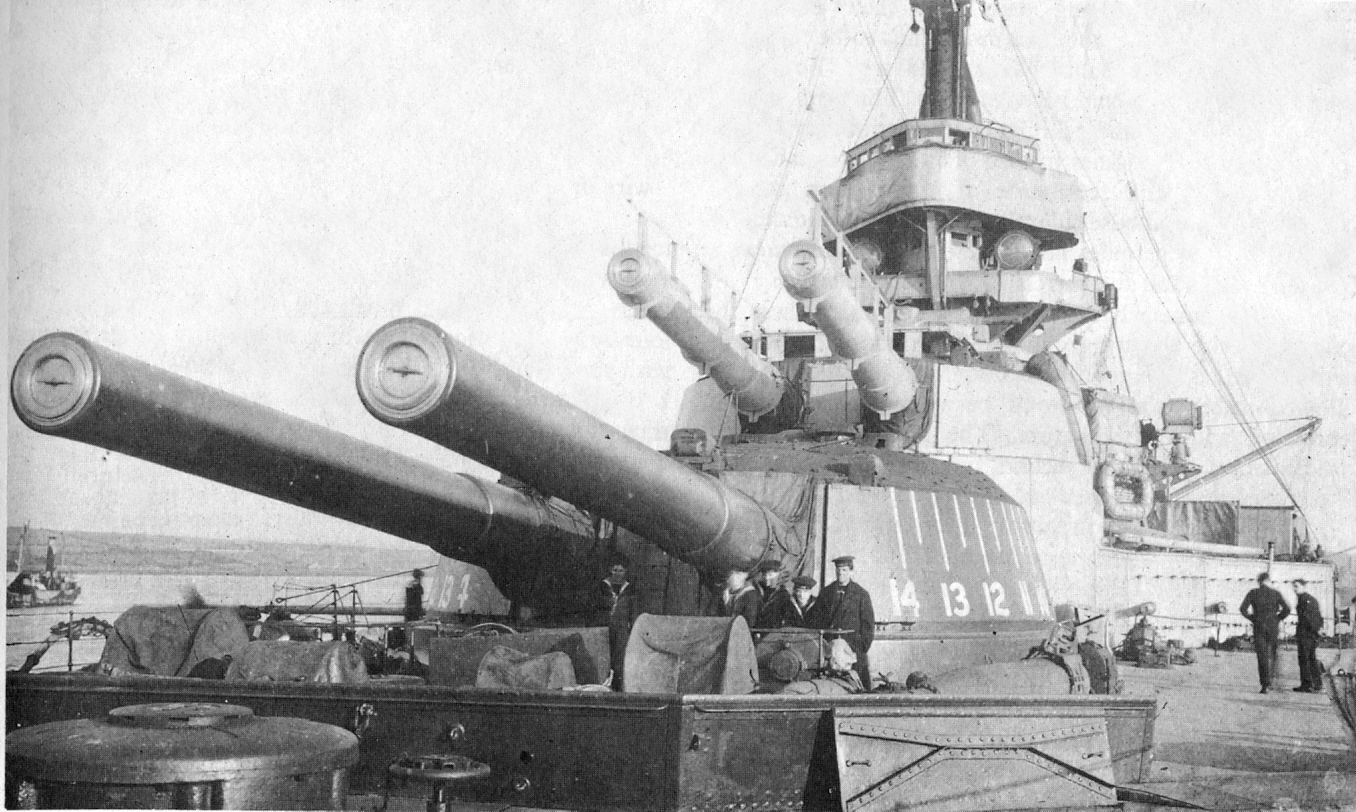
Ajax's forward main-gun turrets in 1918

Like the Orion class, the King George Vs were equipped with 10 breech-loading (BL) 13.5-inch (343 mm) Mark V guns in five hydraulically powered twin-gun turrets, all on the centreline. The turrets were designated 'A', 'B', 'Q', 'X' and 'Y', from front to rear. Their secondary armament consisted of 16 BL 4-inch (102 mm) Mark VII guns. Eight of these were mounted in the forward superstructure, four in the aft superstructure, and four in casemates in the side of the hull abreast of the forward main gun turrets, all in single mounts. Four 3-pounder (1.9 in (47 mm)) saluting guns were also carried. The ships were equipped with three 21-inch (533 mm) submerged torpedo tubes, one on each broadside and another in the stern, for which 14 torpedoes were provided.

The King George V-class ships were protected by a waterline 12-inch (305 mm) armoured belt that extended between the end barbettes. Their decks ranged in thickness between 1 inch (25 mm) and 4 inches with the thickest portions protecting the steering gear in the stern. The main battery turret faces were 11 inches (279 mm) thick, and the turrets were supported by 10-inch-thick (254 mm) barbettes.

=== Modifications ===
A fire-control director was installed on the roof of the spotting top shortly after completion in 1913; her original pole foremast was reinforced by short tripod legs to stiffen it and allow it to bear the weight of the director. By October 1914, a pair of 3-inch (76 mm) anti-aircraft (AA) guns had been added. Approximately 80 long tons (81 t) of additional deck armour was added after the Battle of Jutland. By April 1917, the 4-inch guns had been removed from the hull casemates as they were frequently unusable in heavy seas. The casemates were plated over and some of the compartments were used for accommodations. Her stern torpedo tube was removed in 1917–1918 and a flying-off platform was fitted on the roof of 'B' turret during 1918.

== Construction and career ==
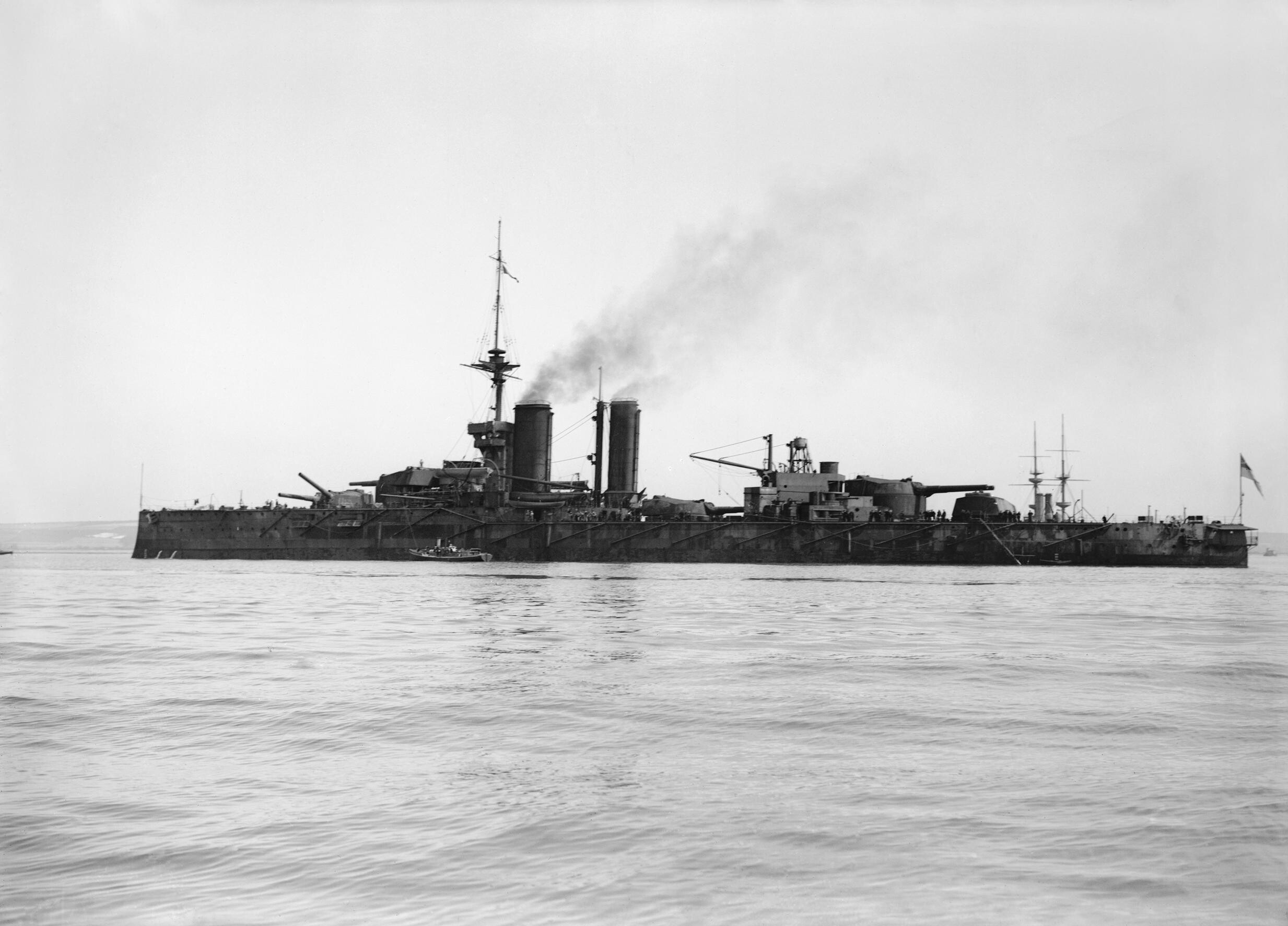
Ajax at anchor, about 1913

Ajax, named after the mythological hero, Ajax, was the fifth ship of her name to serve in the Royal Navy. Ordered under the 1910–1911 Naval Estimates, the ship was laid down by Scotts Shipbuilding & Engineering at their shipyard in Greenock on 27 February 1911 and launched on 21 March 1912. She was completed a year later at a cost of £1,889,387, but was not commissioned until 31 October 1913, joining her sister ships in the 2nd Battle Squadron (BS). All four sisters represented the Royal Navy during the celebrations of the re-opening of the Kaiser Wilhelm Canal, held in conjunction with Kiel Week, in Kiel, Germany, in June 1914.

=== World War I ===
Between 17 and 20 July 1914, Ajax took part in a test mobilisation and fleet review as part of the British response to the July Crisis. Arriving in Portland on 25 July, she was ordered to proceed with the rest of the Home Fleet to Scapa Flow four days later to safeguard the fleet from a possible surprise attack by the Imperial German Navy. In August 1914, following the outbreak of World War I, the Home Fleet was reorganised as the Grand Fleet, and placed under the command of Admiral Sir John Jellicoe. While conducting training exercises a few weeks later, the ship had problems with one of her turrets and had to return to Scapa for repairs. At the beginning of October, the ship began a brief refit at HM Dockyard, Devonport. Repeated reports of submarines in Scapa Flow led Jellicoe to conclude that the defences there were inadequate and he ordered that the Grand Fleet be dispersed to other bases until the defences be reinforced. On 16 October the 2nd BS was sent to Loch na Keal on the western coast of Scotland. The squadron departed for gunnery practice off the northern coast of Ireland on the morning of 27 October and the dreadnought Audacious struck a mine, laid a few days earlier by the German auxiliary minelayer SS Berlin. Thinking that the ship had been torpedoed by a submarine, the other dreadnoughts, including Ajax, were ordered away from the area, while smaller ships rendered assistance. On the evening of 22 November 1914, the Grand Fleet conducted a fruitless sweep in the southern half of the North Sea; Ajax stood with the main body in support of Vice-Admiral David Beatty's 1st Battlecruiser Squadron. The fleet was back in port in Scapa Flow by 27 November.

The interned German ocean liner SS Kronprinzessin Cecilie, HMS Princess, served as a dummy for Ajax from 1 November 1914 until 9 January 1916 when she began her conversion into an armed merchant cruiser. She was based in Loch Ewe, on the western coast of Scotland, and patrolled in the Atlantic.

==== Bombardment of Scarborough, Hartlepool, and Whitby ====
The Royal Navy's Room 40 had intercepted and decrypted German radio traffic containing plans for a German attack on Scarborough, Hartlepool and Whitby in mid-December using the four battlecruisers of Konteradmiral (Rear-Admiral) Franz von Hipper's I Scouting Group. The radio messages did not mention that the High Seas Fleet with fourteen dreadnoughts and eight pre-dreadnoughts would reinforce Hipper. The ships of both sides departed their bases on 15 December, with the British intending to ambush the German ships on their return voyage. They mustered the six dreadnoughts of Vice-Admiral Sir George Warrender's 2nd BS, including Ajax and her sisters King George V and Centurion, and stood with the main body in support of Beatty's four battlecruisers. As the 2nd BS was departing Scapa Flow in the darkness, Ajax collided with a trawler, but suffered no significant damage.

The screening forces of each side blundered into each other during the early morning darkness of 16 December in heavy weather. The Germans got the better of the initial exchange of fire, severely damaging several British destroyers, but Admiral Friedrich von Ingenohl, commander of the High Seas Fleet, ordered his ships to turn away, concerned about the possibility of a massed attack by British destroyers in the dawn's light. A series of miscommunications and mistakes by the British allowed Hipper's ships to avoid an engagement with Beatty's forces.

==== 1915–1916 ====
Jellicoe's ships, including Ajax, conducted gunnery drills on 10–13 January 1915 west of the Orkneys and the Shetland Islands. On the evening of 23 January, the bulk of the Grand Fleet sailed in support of Beatty's battlecruisers, but Ajax and the rest of the fleet did not participate in the ensuing Battle of Dogger Bank the following day. On 7–10 March, the Grand Fleet conducted a sweep in the northern North Sea, during which it conducted training manoeuvres. Another such cruise took place on 16–19 March. On 11 April, the Grand Fleet conducted a patrol in the central North Sea and returned to port on 14 April; another patrol in the area took place on 17–19 April, followed by gunnery drills off Shetland on 20–21 April.

The Grand Fleet conducted sweeps into the central North Sea on 17–19 May and 29–31 May without encountering any German vessels. During 11–14 June, the fleet conducted gunnery practice and battle exercises west of Shetland and more training off Shetland beginning on 11 July. The 2nd BS conducted gunnery practice in the Moray Firth on 2 August and then returned to Scapa Flow. On 2–5 September, the fleet went on another cruise in the northern end of the North Sea and conducted gunnery drills. Throughout the rest of the month, the Grand Fleet conducted numerous training exercises. The ship, together with the majority of the Grand Fleet, conducted another sweep into the North Sea from 13 to 15 October. Almost three weeks later, Ajax participated in another fleet training operation west of Orkney during 2–5 November and repeated the exercise at the beginning of December.

The Grand Fleet sortied in response to an attack by German ships on British light forces near Dogger Bank on 10 February 1916, but it was recalled two days later when it became clear that no German ships larger than a destroyer were involved. The fleet departed for a cruise in the North Sea on 26 February; Jellicoe had intended to use the Harwich Force to sweep the Heligoland Bight, but bad weather prevented operations in the southern North Sea. As a result, the operation was confined to the northern end of the sea. Another sweep began on 6 March, but had to be abandoned the following day as the weather grew too severe for the escorting destroyers. On the night of 25 March, Ajax and the rest of the fleet sailed from Scapa Flow to support Beatty's battlecruisers and other light forces raiding the German Zeppelin base at Tondern. By the time the Grand Fleet approached the area on 26 March, the British and German forces had already disengaged and a strong gale threatened the light craft, so the fleet was ordered to return to base. On 21 April, the Grand Fleet conducted a demonstration off Horns Reef to distract the Germans while the Imperial Russian Navy relaid its defensive minefields in the Baltic Sea. The fleet returned to Scapa Flow on 24 April and refuelled before proceeding south in response to intelligence reports that the Germans were about to launch a raid on Lowestoft, but only arrived in the area after the Germans had withdrawn. On 2–4 May, the fleet conducted another demonstration off Horns Reef to keep German attention focused on the North Sea.

==== Battle of Jutland ====
Maps showing the manoeuvres of the British (blue) and German (red) fleets on 31 May – 1 June 1916

In an attempt to lure out and destroy a portion of the Grand Fleet, the High Seas Fleet, composed of sixteen dreadnoughts, six pre-dreadnoughts and supporting ships, departed the Jade Bight early on the morning of 31 May. The fleet sailed in concert with Hipper's five battlecruisers. Room 40 had intercepted and decrypted German radio traffic containing plans of the operation. In response the Admiralty ordered the Grand Fleet, totalling some 28 dreadnoughts and 9 battlecruisers, to sortie the night before to cut off and destroy the High Seas Fleet.

On 31 May, Ajax, under the command of Captain George Baird, was the second ship from the head of the battle line after deployment. She fired one salvo of six common pointed, capped shells at the battlecruisers of the I Scouting Group shortly after 19:00, (Note: The times used in this section are in UT, which is one hour behind CET, which is often used in German works.) but had to cease fire immediately afterwards when her view was obstructed by the ships of the 4th Light Cruiser Squadron. That was the only time that the ship fired her weapons during the battle.

==== Subsequent activity ====
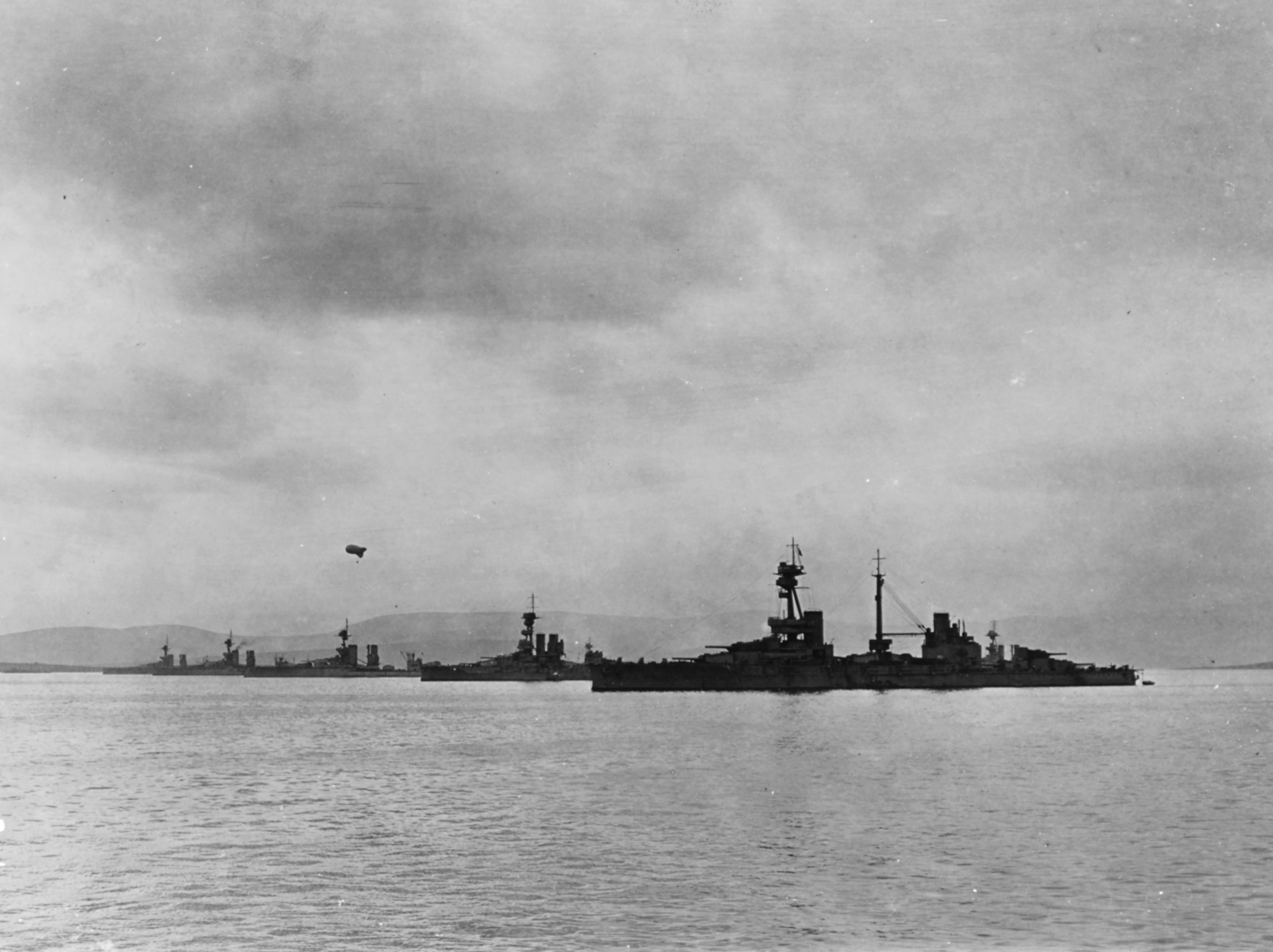
The 2nd Battle Squadron in Scapa Flow, 1918. Agincourt is nearest to the camera with Erin behind her. The other three are, in no order: King George V, Centurion and Ajax. Note the kite balloon over one of the more distant battleships.

The Grand Fleet sortied on 18 August to ambush the High Seas Fleet while it advanced into the southern North Sea, but a series of miscommunications and mistakes prevented Jellicoe from intercepting the German fleet before it returned to port. Two light cruisers were sunk by German U-boats during the operation, prompting Jellicoe to decide to not risk the major units of the fleet south of 55° 30' North due to the prevalence of German submarines and mines. The Admiralty concurred and stipulated that the Grand Fleet would not sortie unless the German fleet was attempting an invasion of Britain or there was a strong possibility it could be forced into an engagement under suitable conditions.

In April 1918, the High Seas Fleet again sortied, to attack British convoys to Norway. They enforced strict wireless silence during the operation, which prevented Room 40 cryptanalysts from warning the new commander of the Grand Fleet, Admiral Beatty. The British only learned of the operation after an accident aboard the battlecruiser SMS Moltke forced her to break radio silence to inform the German commander of her condition. Beatty then ordered the Grand Fleet to sea to intercept the Germans, but he was not able to reach the High Seas Fleet before it turned back for Germany. The ship was present at Rosyth, Scotland, when the High Seas Fleet surrendered there on 21 November.

By 18 July 1919, Ajax was assigned to the 4th Battle Squadron of the Mediterranean Fleet and was refitting in Malta. In February 1920, she assisted in the Evacuation of Odessa, Russia, and returned to Constantinople, Turkey, on 12 February. Vice-Admiral Sir John de Robeck, Commander-in-chief of the Mediterranean Fleet, hoisted his flag in Ajax on 18 April and the ship sailed to the Caucasus to allow him to investigate the situation there as the Bolsheviks advanced. After his arrival two days later, the ship briefly bombarded Bolshevik positions near Sochi before arriving back at Constantinople on 25 April. At the beginning of June, Ajax was in Sevastopol, although she was in Batumi, Georgia, by 22 June, where she remained until 9 July to cover the evacuation of the city by White forces.

De Robeck hoisted his flag again in Ajax in February 1921 as he voyaged from Malta to Smyrna, Turkey, Constantinople, and Lemnos before the ship returned to Malta before the end of the month. During the Chanak Crisis, she was ordered to Smyrna in September 1922, together with much of the rest of the Mediterranean Fleet. After the Armistice of Mudanya ended the crisis, Ajax proceeded to Malta for a refit. When the last Sultan of the Ottoman Empire, Mehmed VI, was deposed in 1922, he was conveyed to Mecca aboard Ajax. The ship returned to Devonport in April 1924 and was placed in reserve. She was paid off and placed on the disposal list in October 1926 to meet the tonnage limitations of the Washington Naval Treaty. On 10 December, Ajax was sold to the Alloa Shipbreaking Company and arrived at Rosyth four days later to be broken up.

== Bibliography ==
- Brooks, John (1996). "Percy Scott and the Director". In McLean, David; Preston, Antony (eds.). Warship 1996. London: Conway Maritime Press. pp. 150–170. ISBN 0-85177-685-X.
- Brown, David K. (1999). The Grand Fleet: Warship Design and Development 1906–1922. Annapolis, Maryland: Naval Institute Press. ISBN 1-55750-315-X.
- Burt, R. A. (1986). British Battleships of World War One. Annapolis, Maryland: Naval Institute Press. ISBN 0-87021-863-8.
- Campbell, N. J. M. (1986). Jutland: An Analysis of the Fighting. Annapolis, Maryland: Naval Institute Press. ISBN 0-87021-324-5.
- Colledge, J. J.; Warlow, Ben (2006) [1969]. Ships of the Royal Navy: The Complete Record of All Fighting Ships of the Royal Navy from the 15th Century to the Present (3rd Rev ed.). London: Chatham Publishing. ISBN 978-1-86176-281-8. OCLC 67375475.
- Corbett, Julian (1997) [1940]. Naval Operations. History of the Great War: Based on Official Documents. Vol. III (Second ed.). London and Nashville, Tennessee: Imperial War Museum in association with the Battery Press. ISBN 1-870423-50-X.
- Friedman, Norman (2015). The British Battleship 1906–1946. Barnsley, UK: Seaforth Publishing. ISBN 978-1-84832-225-7.
- Goldrick, James (2015). Before Jutland: The Naval War in Northern European Waters, August 1914–February 1915. Annapolis, Maryland: Naval Institute Press. ISBN 978-1-59114-349-9.
- Halpern, Paul, ed. (2011). The Mediterranean Fleet, 1919–1929. Publications of the Navy Records Society. Vol. 158. Farnham: Ashgate for the Navy Records Society. ISBN 978-1-4094-2756-8.
- Halpern, Paul G. (1995). A Naval History of World War I. Annapolis, Maryland: Naval Institute Press. ISBN 1-55750-352-4.
- Jellicoe, John (1919). The Grand Fleet, 1914–1916: Its Creation, Development, and Work. New York: George H. Doran Company. OCLC 13614571.
- Massie, Robert K. (2003). Castles of Steel: Britain, Germany, and the Winning of the Great War at Sea. New York: Random House. ISBN 0-679-45671-6.
- Osborne, Richard; Spong, Harry & Grover, Tom (2007). Armed Merchant Cruisers 1878–1945. Windsor, UK: World Warship Society. ISBN 978-0-9543310-8-5.
- Parkes, Oscar (1990) [1966]. British Battleships, Warrior 1860 to Vanguard 1950: A History of Design, Construction, and Armament (New & rev. ed.). Annapolis, Maryland: Naval Institute Press. ISBN 1-55750-075-4.
- Preston, Antony (1985). "Great Britain and Empire Forces". In Gray, Randal (ed.). Conway's All the World's Fighting Ships 1906–1921. Annapolis, Maryland: Naval Institute Press. pp. 1–104. ISBN 0-85177-245-5.
- Silverstone, Paul H. (1984). Directory of the World's Capital Ships. New York: Hippocrene Books. ISBN 0-88254-979-0.
- Tarrant, V. E. (1999) [1995]. Jutland: The German Perspective: A New View of the Great Battle, 31 May 1916. London: Brockhampton Press. ISBN 1-86019-917-8.
