= SS Kronprinzessin Cecilie (1905) =

Hamburg America Line ocean liner

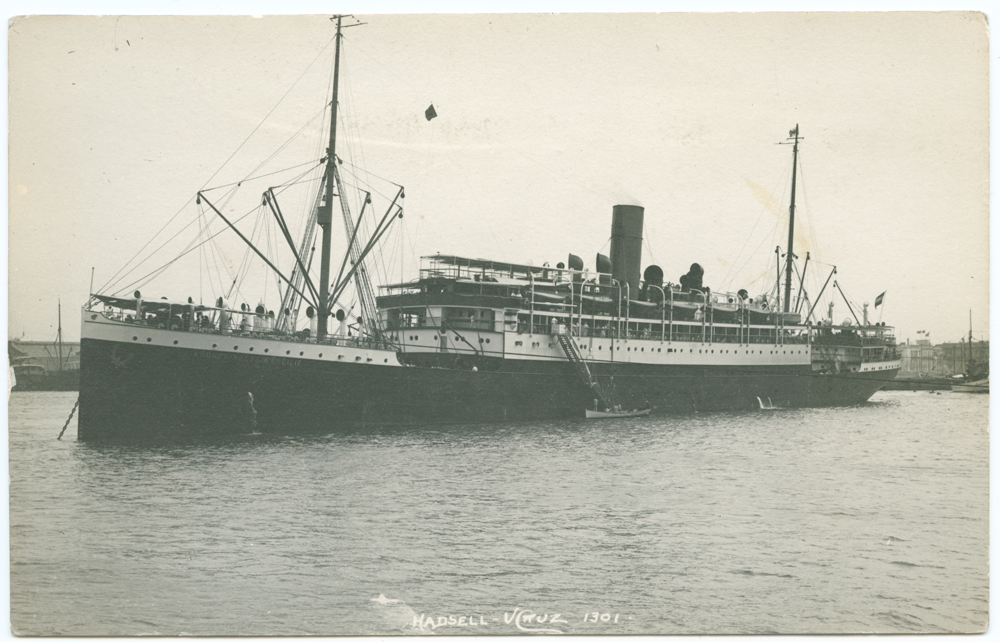
- Kronprinzessin Cecilie in Vera Cruz

History
- Name: 1905: Kronprinzessin Cecilie; 1915: Princess
- Namesake: Cecilie of Mecklenburg-Schwerin
- Owner: 1906: Hamburg America Line; 1919: Shipping Controller
- Operator: 1915: (United Kingdom) Royal Navy; 1919: Ellerman & Bucknall
- Port of registry: 1906: (German Empire) Hamburg; 1919: (United Kingdom) London
- Route: 1906: Hamburg – Vera Cruz
- Builder: F Krupp Germaniawerft, Kiel
- Yard number: 108
- Laid down: 1 January 1905
- Launched: 14 October 1905
- Completed: 20 February 1906
- Maiden voyage: 14 March 1906
- Identification: 1906: code letters RPCD; by 1913: call sign DCI; 1916: pennant number MI.57; 1918: pennant number MI.91; 1919:UK official number 143933; 1919: code letters JQWM
- Fate: scrapped May 1923
- Commissioned: as dummy Ajax, March 1915
- Decommissioned: as dummy Ajax, October 1915
- Recommissioned: as AMC, 6 May 1916
- Decommissioned: as AMC, 10 September 1917

General characteristics
- Type: ocean liner
- Tonnage: 8,689 GRT, 5,053 NRT, 7,380 DWT
- Displacement: 14,350 tons
- Length: 471.4 ft (143.7 m)
- Beam: 55.3 ft (16.9 m)
- Draught: 25 ft (7.6 m)
- Depth: 30.0 ft (9.1 m)
- Decks: 2
- Installed power: 800 NHP; 6,070 ihp
- Propulsion: 2 × quadruple-expansion engines; 2 × screws
- Speed: 14 1/2 knots (27 km/h)
- Capacity: passengers: 326 × 1st class; 44 × 2nd class; 915 × 3rd class
- Crew: 200
- Sensors & processing systems: by 1910: submarine signalling
- Armament: as AMC: 8 × 6-inch QF guns; 2 × 6-pounder anti-aircraft guns
- Notes: sister ship: Fürst Bismarck

Kronprinzessin Cecilie was a Hamburg America Line (HAPAG) ocean liner. She was launched in Schleswig-Holstein in 1905. Her scheduled route was between Hamburg and Mexico.

The United Kingdom captured her in 1914, and converted her in 1915 into a dummy of the battleship HMS Ajax, as which she operated from northwest Scotland. In 1916 she was converted into HMS Princess, a real Royal Navy armed merchant cruiser, as which she took part in the East African campaign.

In 1919 she returned to merchant service as Princess. Ellerman & Bucknall managed her for the UK Shipping Controller. She was scrapped in 1923.

The ship is sometimes confused with the Norddeutscher Lloyd transatlantic liner Kronprinzessin Cecilie, which was launched only a year later. The NDL ship was a four-funnel liner, far larger than the HAPAG ship.

== Building ==
The ship was the second of a pair of sisters that HAPAG commissioned, one from the Fairfield Shipbuilding and Engineering Company in Glasgow, and the other from Friedrich Krupp Germaniawerft in Kiel. They were laid down as Wettin and Wittelsbach respectively, but launched as Fürst Bismarck and Kronprinzessin Cecilie.

The Germaniawerft ship was built as yard number 108. Her keel plates were laid on 1 January 1905. She was to have been named Wittelsbach, after either the House of Wittelsbach or Wittelsbach Castle. But she was launched on 17 October 1905 as Kronprinzessin Cecilie, after Duchess Cecilie of Mecklenburg-Schwerin, who as wife of Crown Prince Wilhelm was Crown Princess of the German Empire. The ship was completed on 20 February 1906.

Kronprinzessin Cecilie's registered length was 471.4 ft (143.7 m), her beam was 55.3 ft (16.9 m), her depth was 30.0 ft (9.1 m), and her draught was 25 ft (7.6 m). Her hull had nine watertight bulkheads. Her tonnages were 8,689 GRT, 5,053 NRT, 7,380 DWT, and 14,350 displacement. 8,200 cubic feet (232 m^{3}) of her cargo capacity was refrigerated. As built, she had berths for 1,285 passengers: 326 in first class; 44 in second class; and 915 in third class.

Kronprinzessin Cecilie had one single-ended and three double-ended boilers, with a working pressure of 214 pounds per square inch (1,480 kPa). They supplied steam to a pair of quadruple-expansion engines, each of which developed 3,035 ihp at 79 RPM. They drove a pair of four-bladed manganese bronze screws. She had three 400-Amp AEG dynamos to supply 102-Volt electric current throughout the ship. She was equipped with wireless telegraphy. She had a crew of 219.

== Kronprinzessin Cecilie ==
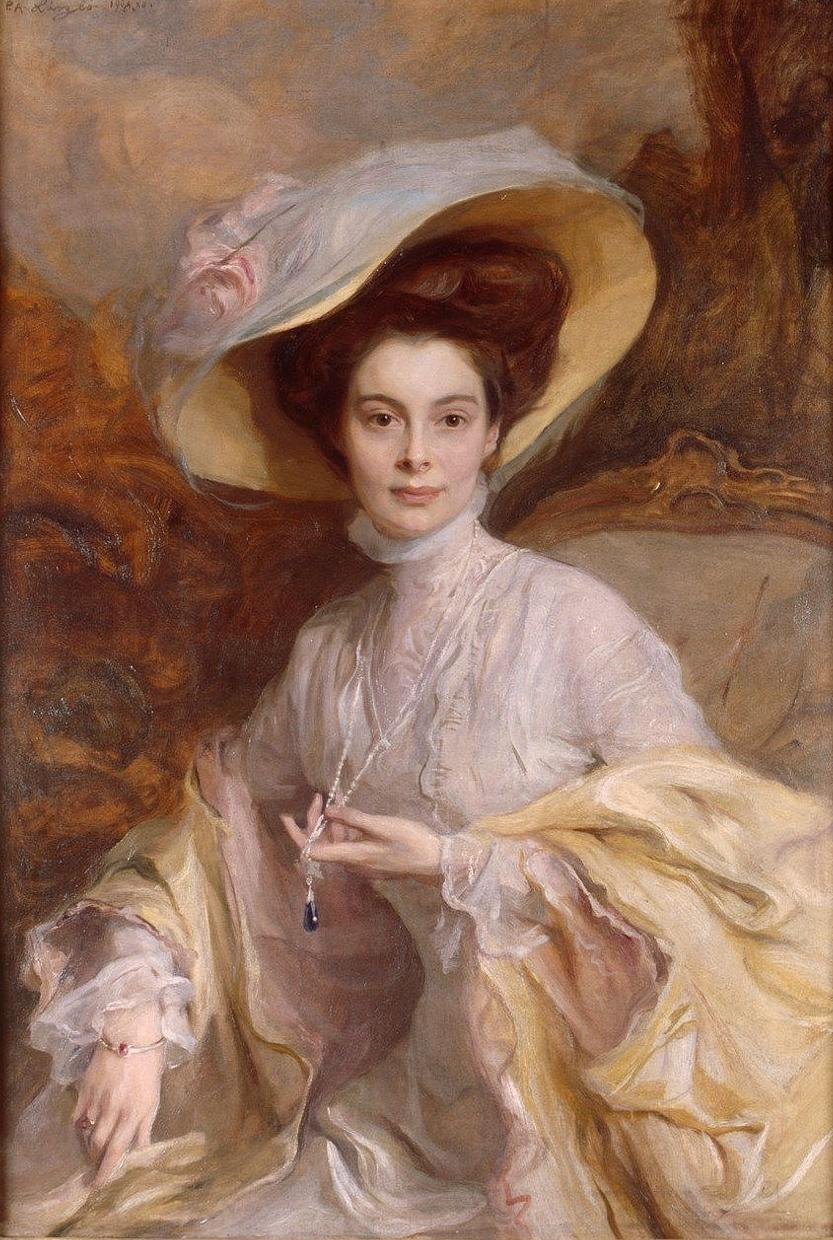
Portrait of Duchess Cecilie of Mecklenburg-Schwerin, Crown Princess of Germany, painted by Philip de László

HAPAG registered Kronprinzessin Cecilie in Hamburg. Her code letters were RPCD. On 14 March 1906 she left Hamburg on her maiden voyage, which was to Tampico and Vera Cruz in Mexico. On the voyage her average speed was 14.4 knots (26.7 km/h). She and her sister ship Fürst Bismarck were HAPAG's largest ships on the route.

Kronprinzessin Cecilie also made cruises, for which her hull was repainted white. On 2 February 1907 she left HAPAG's terminal at Hoboken, New Jersey with passengers for the West Indies.

By 1910 Kronprinzessin Cecilie was equipped with submarine signalling. By 1913 her wireless call sign was DCI. On 30 October 1913 she rescued the crew of the French barque Patrie in the North Atlantic.

In April 1914 the USA caught the HAPAG ship Ypiranga gun-running for President Victoriano Huerta's army in the Mexican Revolution. After the "Ypiranga incident", the US was suspicious of any unusual activity by HAPAG ships. On 8 May it was alleged that Kronprinzessin Cecilie had arrived in Puerto Mexico (now Coatzacoalcos) carrying arms. On 10 May Admiral Badger, who was in Vera Cruz, reported that although Kronprinzessin Cecilie was carrying arms and ammunition, they were not unloaded in Puerto Mexico, and she would take them back to Hamburg. On 13 May he confirmed that she did not land the arms at Vera Cruz either.

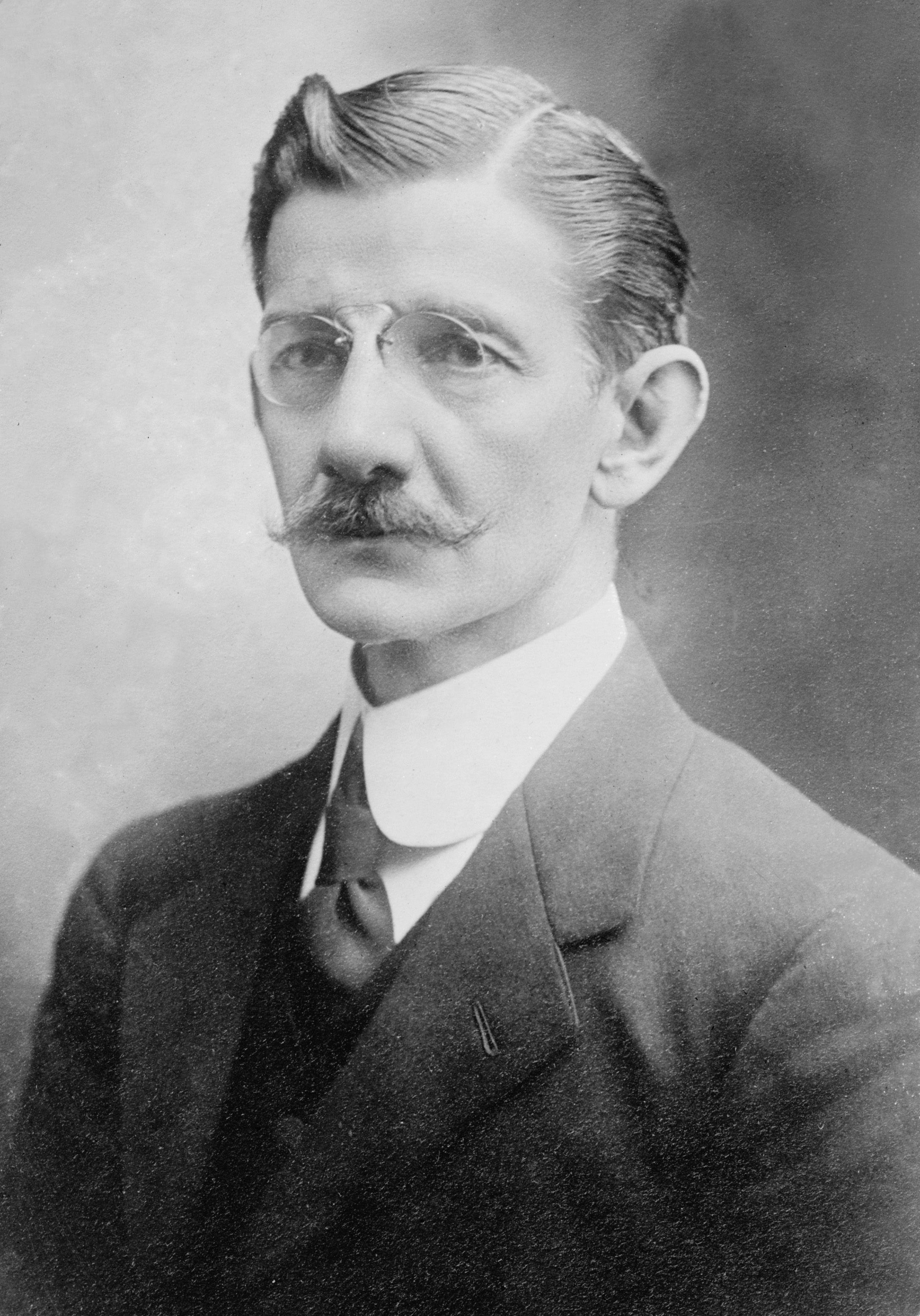
Emilio Rabasa

Huerta sent a delegation to a peace conference to be held at Niagara Falls, Ontario. On 10 May Emilio Rabasa, Agustín Rodríguez, and Luis Elguero embarked on Kronprinzessin Cecilie at Vera Cruz to travel as far as Havana, where they were to change ships to reach Key West, Florida. From there the delegation was to continue overland to Niagara Falls. Kronprinzessin Cecilie was delayed in Vera Cruz, waiting to embark refugees who were expected from Tampico. The ship reached Havana on 14 May, where Rabasa, Rodríguez, and Elguero made their connection to Key West.

On 25 July 1914 Kronprinzessin Cecilie left Hoboken for Hamburg. On 3 August, France declared war on the Central Powers. A French Navy cruiser pursued Kronprinzessin Cecilie, which took refuge in Falmouth, Cornwall. The next morning the United Kingdom declared war on the Central Powers. German ships in UK-controlled ports, including Kronprinzessin Cecilie, were seized.

== Princess ==
On 21 October 1914 the Admiralty ordered the conversion of Kronprinzessin Cecilie into a dummy of the battleship HMS Ajax. On 1 November a contract was placed with Harland & Wolff in Belfast. She was given false superstructure and guns made of wood and canvas. She was ballasted to sit lower in the water, to create an illusion of greater length. The conversion was completed in March 1915. She was based at Loch Ewe in Ross-shire, from which she patrolled the North Atlantic. By October 1915 she had been paid off. At some point in 1915 the ship was renamed Princess.

Princess was then converted into a real armed merchant cruiser. Eight QF 6-inch naval guns were fitted as her primary armament. Two QF 6-pounder Hotchkiss guns provided anti-aircraft defence. She was completed on 9 January 1916. In March 1916 a prize court declared Princess to be a prize ship.

On 6 May 1916 Princess was commissioned at Belfast as HMS Princess, with the pennant number MI.57. She was sent to take part in the East African campaign. She left Belfast on 2 July, called at São Vicente, Ascension Island, and Saint Helena, and was in port at Simon's Town from 29 July until 9 August. She continued via Durban to Zanzibar, where she arrived on 22 August. The next day, she positioned herself off Dar es Salaam and opened fire on German positions ashore.

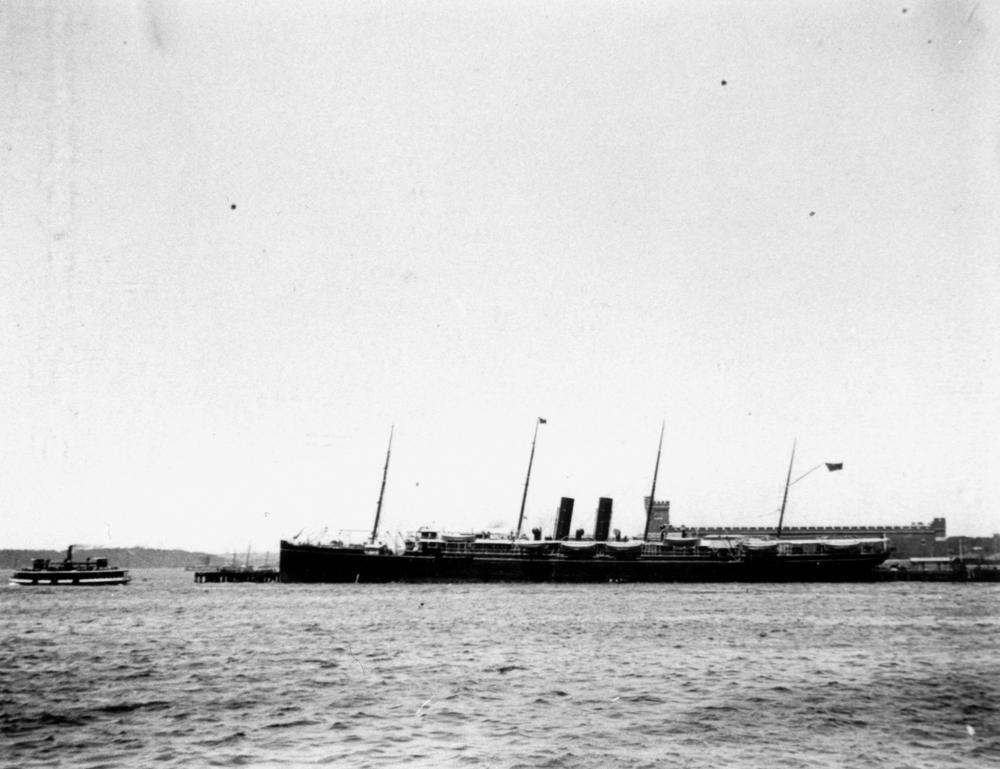
The armed merchant cruiser HMS Himalaya, which also took part in the landing at Mikindani

Princess patrolled the coast of German East Africa. On 13 September she and other Royal Navy ships landed troops at Mikindani, near the border with Moçambique. Princess sent seven boats ashore. The British captured the town without resistance.

Apart from a visit to Palma on 8–10 December 1916, just over the border in Moçambique, Princess continued to patrol the coast of German East Africa. On 22 February she sent troops ashore in six boats at Lindi. On 16 May 1917 she left Dar-es-Salaam for South Africa. She spent most of the time in Simonstown, plus shorter visits to Cape Town and Durban.

On 11 September she embarked troops at Durban. On 18 September she sent 200 troops ashore at Lindi, and on 26 September she landed further troops at Dar-es-Salaam. She stayed in Dar-es-Salaam until 28 September, when she embarked troops to repatriate to India. She stopped at Zanzibar until 1 October. She crossed the Indian Ocean to Bombay (now Mumbai), where she reached Alexandra Dock (now Indira Dock) on 11 October. She was decommissioned there on 13 October. However, in January 1918 she was still on Royal Navy records, with her pennant number changed to M.91.

In 1919 Princess was registered in London. Her UK official number was 143933 and her code letters were JQWM. The Shipping Controller appointed Ellerman & Bucknall, a company in the Ellerman Lines group, to manage her. She was scrapped in May 1923.

== Books and journals ==
- Dittmar, Frederick James; Colledge, James Joseph (1972), British warships, 1914–1919, Littlehampton: Littlehampton Book Services, ISBN 0-7110-0380-7, LCCN 0711003807
- Guenther, FC (1907). "The Hamburg-American Steamer Kronprinzessin Cecilie". International Marine Engineering. XII (December). New York: Marine Engineering Incorporated: 481–490 – via Internet Archive.
- Guenther, FC (1908). "The New North German Lloyd Steamship Kronprinzessin Cecilie". International Marine Engineering. XIII (January). New York: Marine Engineering Incorporated: 23–28 – via Internet Archive.
- Haws, Duncan (1980). The Ships of the Hamburg America, Adler and Carr Lines. Merchant Fleets in Profile. Vol. 4. Cambridge: Patrick Stephens Ltd. ISBN 0-85059-397-2.
- Lloyd's Register of British and Foreign Shipping. Vol. I.–Steamers. London: Lloyd's Register of Shipping. 1906 – via Internet Archive.
- Lloyd's Register of British and Foreign Shipping. Vol. I.–Steamers. London: Lloyd's Register of Shipping. 1910 – via Internet Archive.
- Lloyd's Register of Shipping. Vol. I.–Steamers and Motor Vessels. London: Lloyd's Register of Shipping. 1922 – via Internet Archive.
- The Marconi Press Agency Ltd (1913). The Year Book of Wireless Telegraphy and Telephony. London: The St Katherine Press.
- The Marconi Press Agency Ltd (1914). The Year Book of Wireless Telegraphy and Telephony. London: The Marconi Press Agency Ltd.
- Mercantile Navy List. London. 1920 – via Crew List Index Project.
- Money, Paul, ed. (17 November 2021). "HMS Princess– May 1916 to September 1917, East Indies Station (including German East Africa)". Royal Navy Log Books of the World War 1 Era. Naval-History.net.
- Osborne, Richard; Spong, Harry & Grover, Tom (2007). Armed Merchant Cruisers 1878–1945. Windsor: World Ship Society. ISBN 978-0-9543310-8-5.
- Rothe, Klaus (1986). Deutsche Ozean-Passagierschiffe 1896 bis 1918. Bibliothek der Schiffstypen (in German). Berlin: VEB Verlag für Verkehrswesen. ISBN 3-344-00059-4.

== Newspapers ==
- "Ocean travelers". The New York Times. 2 February 1907. p. 18 – via Times Machine.
- "Activity at Galveston Follows Orders From Washington". The New York Times. 9 May 1914. p. 1 – via Times Machine.
- "Arms for Huerta on German ships". The New York Times. 9 May 1914. p. 2 – via Times Machine.
- "Delegates via Key West". The New York Times. 9 May 1914. p. 2 – via Times Machine.
- "Hears German ship did not land arms". The New York Times. 10 May 1914. p. 2 – via Times Machine.
- "Huerta delegates reach Vera Cruz, to oppose terms ousting dictator, which Washington will insist on". The New York Times. 11 May 1914. p. 1 – via Times Machine.
- "Keep Huerta arms still aboard ship". The New York Times. 11 May 1914. p. 3 – via Times Machine.
- "Huerta delegates off for conference". The New York Times. 12 May 1914. p. 2 – via Times Machine.
- "Landed No Huerta Arms". The New York Times. 14 May 1914. p. 2 – via Times Machine.
- "Our powers ample, say Huerta envoys". The New York Times. 15 May 1914. p. 1 – via Times Machine.
- "Shipping and mails". The New York Times. 25 July 1914. p. 11 – via Times Machine.
- "Two German liners held to be prizes". The New York Times. 24 March 1916. p. 3 – via Times Machine.
