= Emilio Rabasa =

Mexican politician

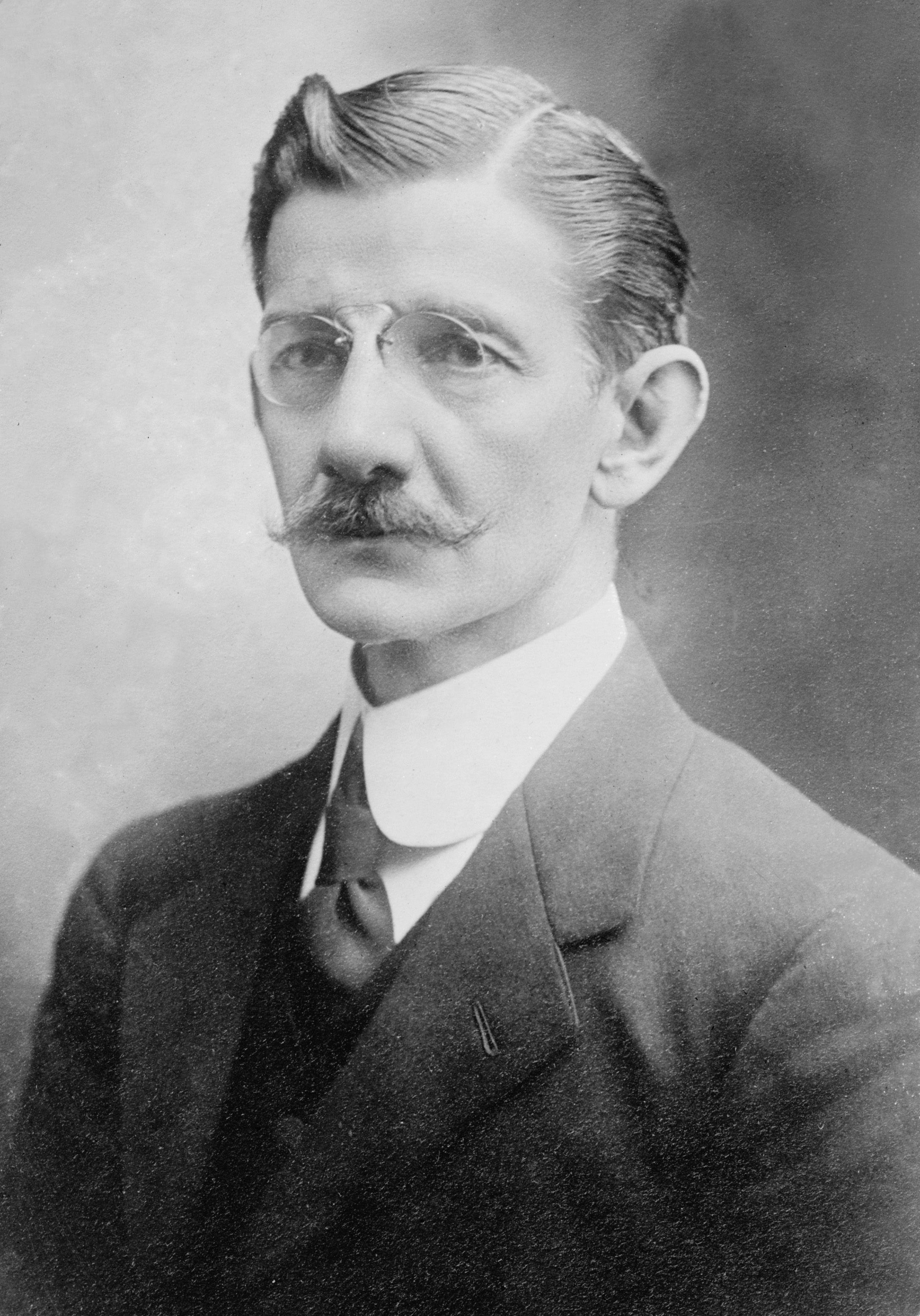

Governor of Chiapas
- In office 1891–1895

Personal details
- Born: Emilio Rabasa Estebanell; 22 May 1856 Ocozocoautla, Chiapas, Mexico
- Died: 25 April 1930 (aged 73) Mexico City, Mexico
- Education: Institute of Sciences and Arts of Oaxaca
- Occupation: Writer, diplomat, politician, lawyer.
- Awards: Order of the Sun of Peru

José Emilio Rabasa Estebanell (22 May 1856 — 25 April 1930) was a Mexican prominent writer, diplomat, and politician. He wrote extensively on constitutional law, served as Governor of Chiapas, as state congressman, chaired several Mexican Academies and co-founded El Universal; an influential newspaper in Mexico City.

Rabasa wrote several novels under the pen name Sancho Polo.

Rabasa, Agustín Rodríguez and Luis Elguero left Veracruz on May 10, 1914 aboard the German ship Kronprinzessin Cecilie to represent Victoriano Huerta's regime at the Niagara Falls conference mediating the dispute with the United States. The delegation, along with support staff, arrived in Washington on May 16 where they were hosted by the State Department until departure for the conference on May 20, a change from May 18 in order to make time for the delegation's visit to Washington. On May 18 the delegation had been empowered to offer Huerta's resignation if necessary and began work at Niagara Falls on May 20 under the auspices of mediators composed of officials of Argentina, Brazil and Chile. An agreement resulted in the signing of a peace protocol on June 24, 1914.

== Teaching career ==
Rabasa taught Constitutional Law at the National School of Jurisprudence, which he resigned in 1912. He was also a founding teacher of the Free School of Law, where he taught Constitutional Law from 1912 to 1930. He was appointed rector of the Free School of Law. Right in the year of 1929, position that left vacant after his death in Mexico City on April 25, 1930.

He was professor of the National Schools and Free of Jurisprudence in teaching persevered until the end of his days and was recognized authority in Constitutional Law, he was entrusted with other important positions, such as the representative of the Government at the Niagara Falls Conferences in 1914 From then on, he spent six years in New York. He was Correspondent of the Royal Spanish Academies and of Jurisprudence and member of diverse scientific and literary groups. He collaborated brilliantly in national journalism and in specialized journals in legal matters. He was appointed member of the Mexican Academy of Language to occupy chair I, but he did not occupy it.

== Selected works ==
- La bola (1887)
- La gran ciencia (1887)
- El cuarto poder (1888)
- Moneda falsa (1888)
