= George Henry Baird =

Royal Navy officer

Rear-Admiral Sir George Henry Baird, KCB (14 October 1871 – 22 October 1924) was a Royal Navy officer.

From 1916 to 1918, Baird was in command of HMS Ajax and took part in the Battle of Jutland as part of the 2nd Battle Squadron.

He was promoted to rear admiral on 26 March 1920.
