= Port of Nagasaki =

Port of Nagasaki 長崎港
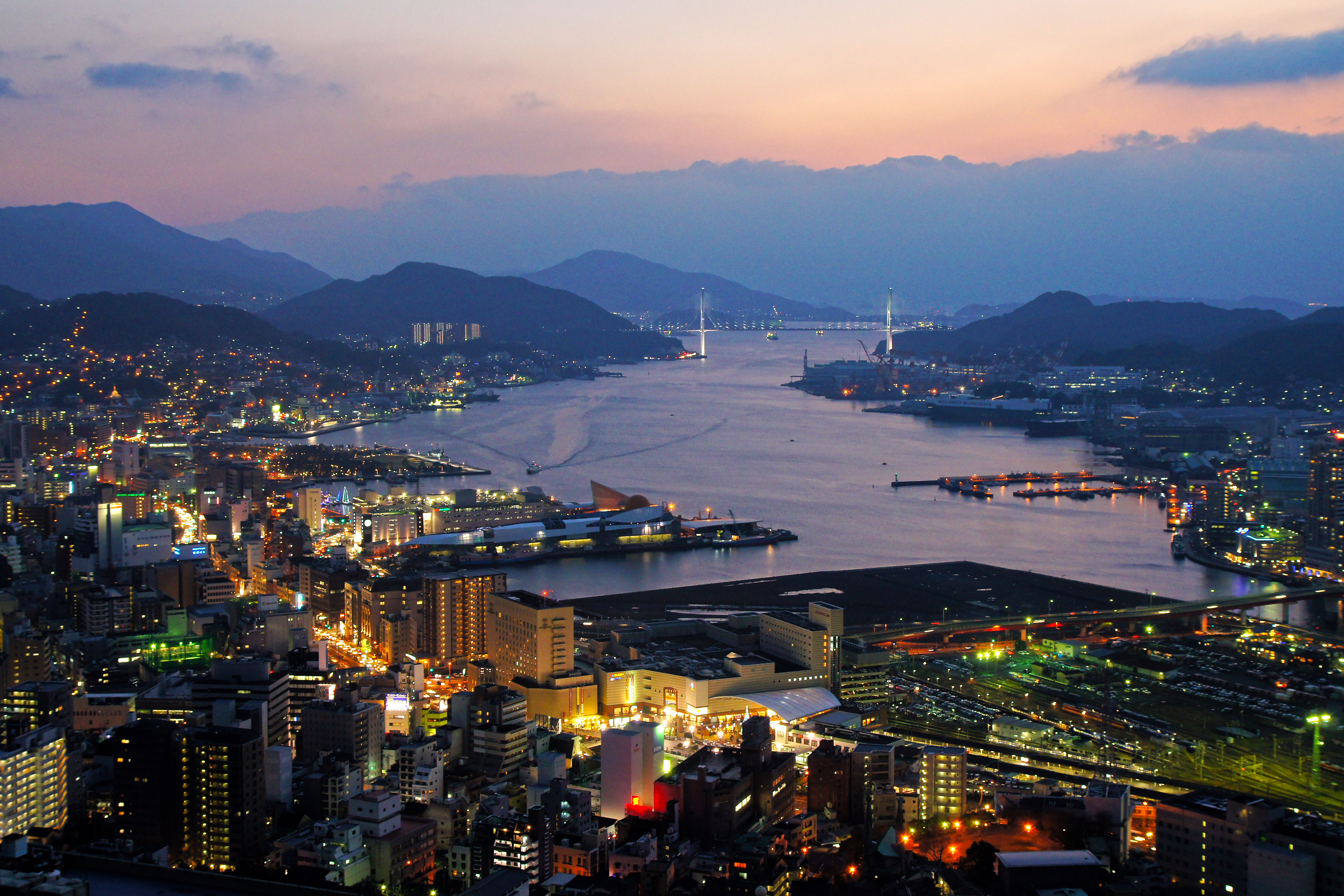
- Port of Nagasaki
- Interactive map of Port of Nagasaki 長崎港

Location
- Country: Japan
- Location: Nagasaki, Nagasaki Prefecture
- Coordinates: 32°44′40.2″N 129°51′59.7″E

Details
- Opened: 1571
- Operated by: Nagasaki Prefecture

The Port of Nagasaki (長崎港, Nagasaki-kō) is a seaport in Nagasaki, Nagasaki Prefecture, Japan.
