= SS Augusta Victoria =

Ocean liner

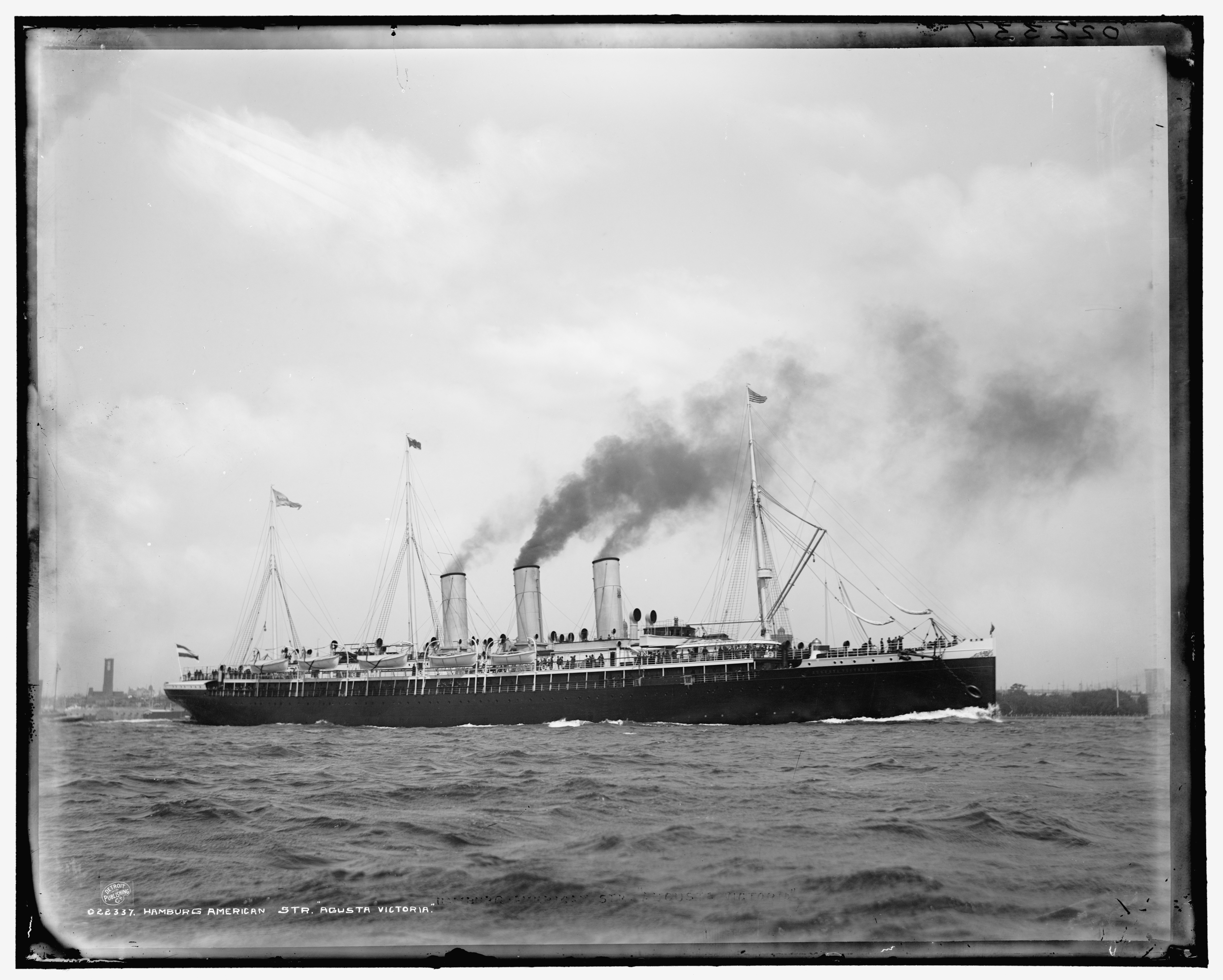
- Augusta Victoria as first launched, about 1890

History

Germany
- Name: Augusta Victoria, Auguste Victoria
- Namesake: Empress Augusta Victoria
- Operator: Hamburg America Line
- Builder: Stettiner Maschinenbau AG Vulcan
- Launched: 1 December 1888
- Maiden voyage: 10 May 1889

Russia
- Name: Kuban
- Namesake: Kuban in southern Russia
- Owner: Imperial Russian Navy
- Acquired: 1904
- Fate: Broken up in Stettin, 1907

General characteristics
- Type: Ocean liner, later auxiliary cruiser
- Tonnage: 7,661 GRT; 1897: 8,479 GRT
- Length: 144.80 m (475.1 ft) oa; 140.5 m (461.0 ft) B.P.; 1897: 163.10 m (535.1 ft) oa
- Beam: 16.90 m (55.4 ft)
- Propulsion: 2 triple expansion engines, 2 screw propellers
- Speed: maximum 18.5 kn (34.3 km/h); 1897: 19 kn (35.2 km/h)
- Capacity: 400 1st class, 120 2nd class, 580 steerage
- Crew: 245

Augusta Victoria, later Auguste Victoria, placed in service in 1889 and named for Empress Augusta Victoria, wife of German Emperor Wilhelm II, was the name ship of the Augusta Victoria series and the first of a new generation of luxury Hamburg America Line ocean liners. She was the first liner built in continental Europe with twin propellers and when first placed in service, the fastest liner in the Atlantic trade. In 1897, the ship was rebuilt and lengthened and in 1904 she was sold to the Imperial Russian Navy, which renamed her Kuban.

== Engineering ==
The ship had eight double ended main coal fired boilers and an auxiliary boiler. The main boilers provided steam for the two inverted three cylinder triple expansion engines each driving a steel four bladed 18 ft (5.5 m) diameter propeller with 32 ft (9.8 m) pitch. Maximum power was about 25,000 ihp. Coal bunker capacity was 2,260 tons and consumption about 220 tons per day.

== History ==
=== Hamburg America Line ===
Albert Ballin commissioned Augusta Victoria and her sister ship Columbia in 1887, soon after joining the Hamburg America Line as head of passenger service. Augusta Victoria, the first to be put in service, was originally to have been called Normannia but was renamed for the Empress after Wilhelm II became Emperor. In the 1890s the line added the larger Normannia and SS Fürst Bismarck to the series. Augusta Victoria was the first continental European liner with twin screws, (Note: According to Huldermann, 1922, p. 196, she was to have been built at a British yard, like Columbia, but the then Crown Prince Wilhelm insisted the job be given to a German yard. According to Straub, p. 45, it was a "not even publicly expressed wish".) which made her both faster and more reliable. (The two previous twin-screw liners were the British-built City of New York and City of Paris of the Inman Line.) In May 1889, her maiden voyage to New York broke a record, taking only seven days. (Note: According to Huldermann and to Cecil, pp. 22–23, she captured the Blue Riband; according to Gerhardt, p. 33, SS Deutschland won this distinction for Hamburg America for the first and only time in 1900.) In November 1889, Nellie Bly sailed to Southampton on the Augusta Victoria on the first leg of her 72-day race around the world.

She was also the first luxury liner at Hamburg America, introducing the concept of the "floating hotel"; she had "a rococo stairhall, illuminated by a milky way of pear-shaped prisms and naked light bulbs clutched by gilded cherubs, a reception court choked by palm trees and a dark and gothic smoking room." Ballin had her interior design work done by Johann Poppe, the designer at Hamburg America's rival line, North German Lloyd, whose ships already had a reputation for elegance. She was immediately successful, but she and her sister ship were an economic drain on the line because they required more coal than slower ships and could not carry much freight or many steerage passengers and were therefore profitable only in the summer season, and it was risky to operate them at all from Hamburg in very bad weather, when the Elbe was packed with ice.

Off-season pleasure cruises were therefore started in 1891, and Augusta Victoria's cruise in the Mediterranean and the Near East from 22 January to 22 March 1891, with 241 passengers including the Ballins themselves, is often stated to have been the first ever cruise. (Note: For example by Kludas and Bischoff; Gerhardt p. 36; Haller, giving 174 as the number of passengers.) Christian Wilhelm Allers published an illustrated account of it as Backschisch (Baksheesh). Some people claim the British Orient Line was the first to offer cruises since the late 1880s. However, those ships were principally for the transportation of passenger, goods and mail between two or more ports, such as between England and Australia, with leisure travel being an adjunct.

In 1897, the ship underwent a comprehensive rebuilding at Harland & Wolff in Belfast arriving in the graving dock 19 December 1896. She was lengthened by 61 ft (18.6 m), her tonnage increased, and her speed increased by half a knot, and the middle of her three masts was removed. The new section was to be inserted between the second and third boiler compartments with an additional boiler inserted to total nine. Part of the original forward boiler compartment would be converted to staterooms. Her name was also changed to Auguste Victoria to correct an original inaccuracy; the Empress spelt her name with an e.

=== Imperial Russian Navy ===
While Augusta Victoria was under construction, the Emperor persuaded both Hamburg America and its rival Norddeutscher Lloyd to make their future liners convertible to auxiliary cruisers in time of war. Like all German fast liners built from then until 1914, she therefore had reinforced decks which could support gun platforms. In 1904 she and the other three ships in the series were sold to the Russian Navy; she was renamed Kuban and became a cruiser, but was assigned to be a scout ship. She sailed in the Far East with Admiral Zinovy Rozhestvensky's fleet in the Russo-Japanese War, but did not see action. She was broken up at Stettin in 1907.

Gallery

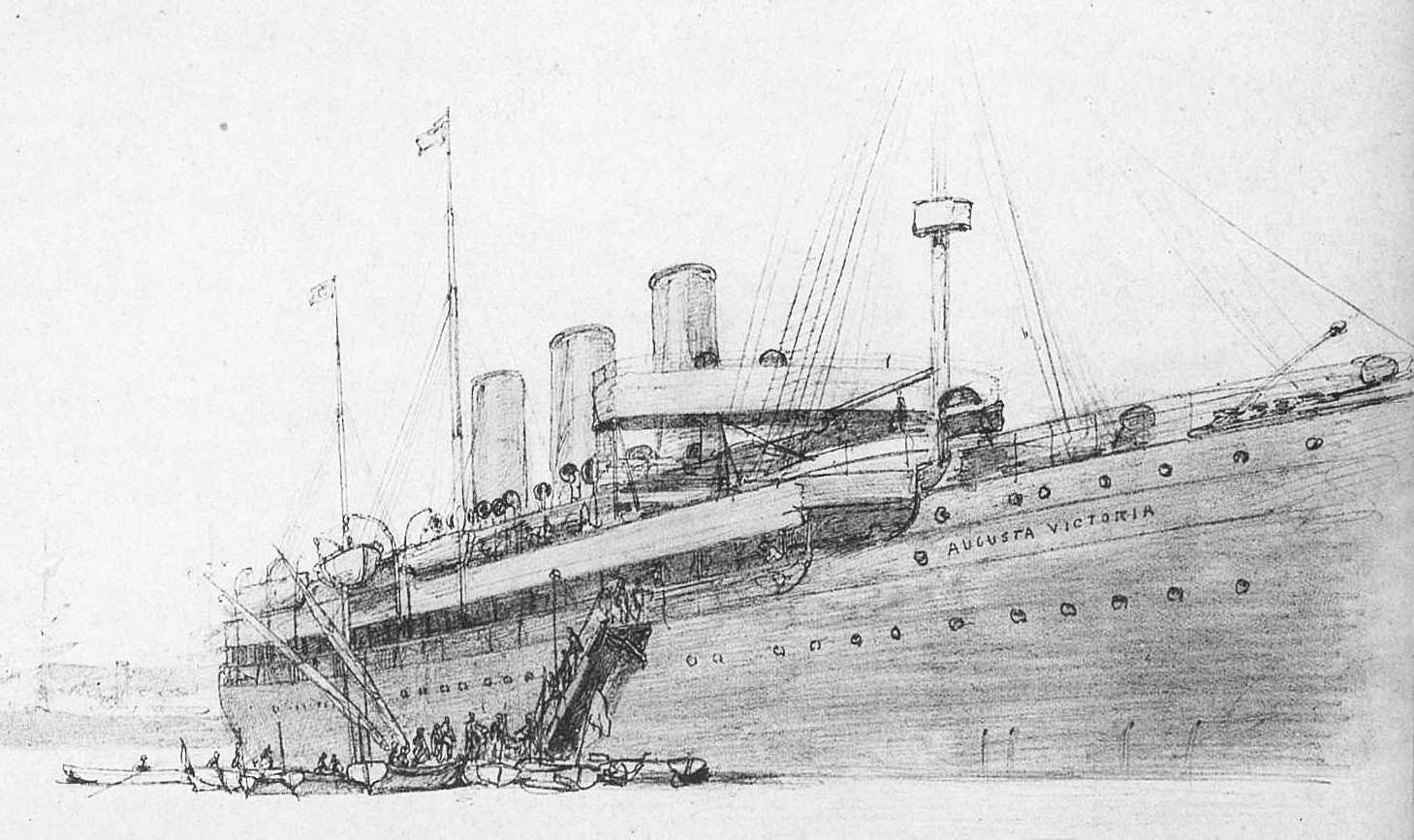
Augusta Victoria docked at Piraeus on her first cruise, from C.W. Allers' Backschisch

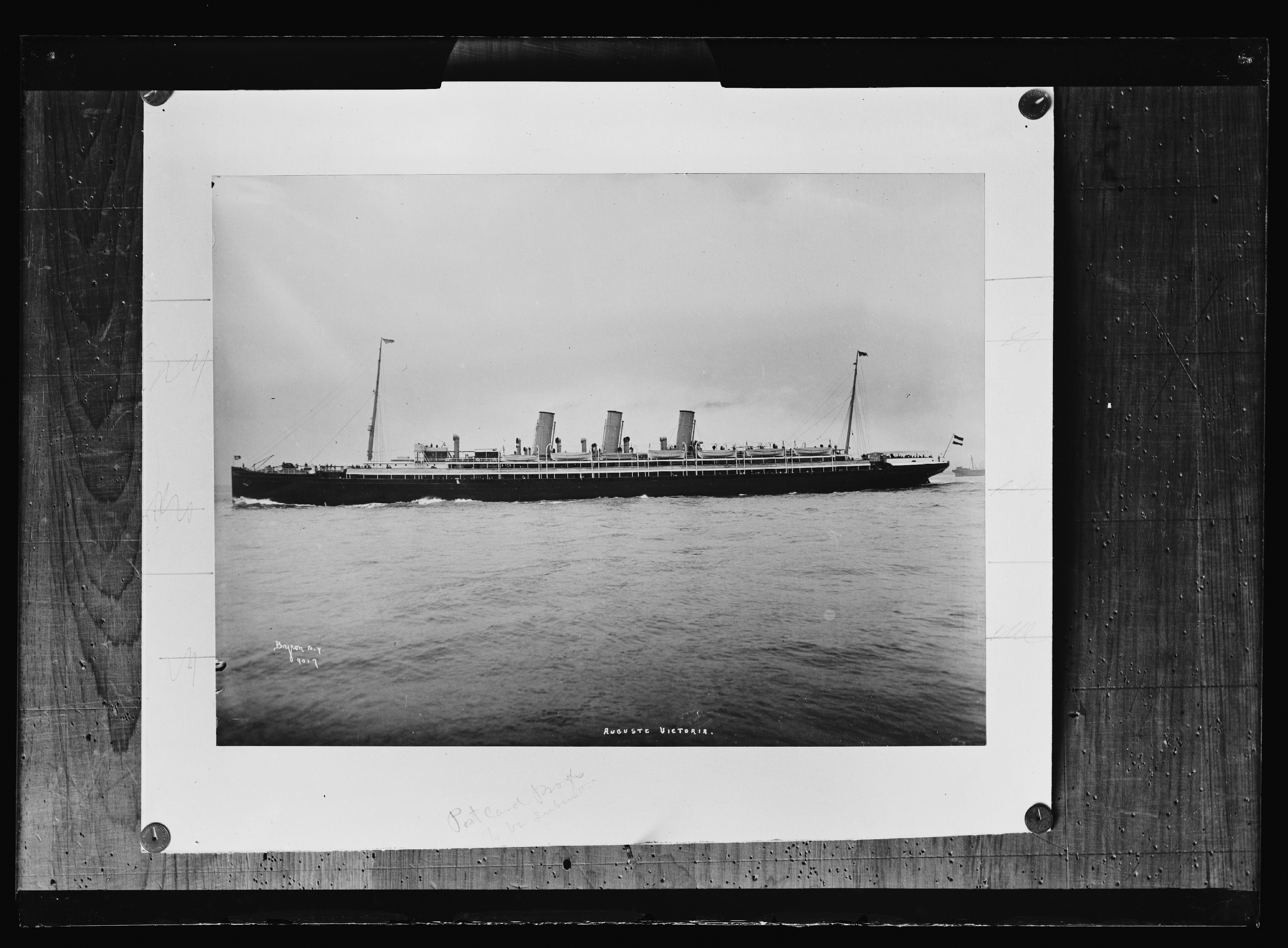
Auguste Victoria around 1900 after her rebuild

== Sources ==
- Allers, Christian (1891). Backschisch: Erinnerungen an die Reise der "Auguste Victoria" in den Orient (in German). Hamburg: Griese. OCLC 245856783. (Reissued as Backschisch: Skizzen zu einer Orient-Kreuzfahrt im Jahre 1891 (in German). Hamburg: Eckardt & Messtorff. 1973. ISBN 978-3-7702-2700-6.
- Cecil, Lamar (1967). Albert Ballin: Business and Politics in Imperial Germany, 1888–1918. Princeton, NJ: Princeton University. OCLC 900428.
- Gerhardt, Johannes (2009). Albert Ballin (PDF). Mäzene für Wissenschaft (in German). Hamburg: Hamburg University. ISBN 978-3-937816-67-8.
- Gibbs, C.R. Vernon (1957). Passenger Liners of the Western Ocean: A Record of the North Atlantic Steam and Motor Passenger Vessels from 1838 to the Present Day (2nd ed.). London: Staples. OCLC 225962096.
- Haller, Bernt (June 2000). "Gipfelsturm auf hoher See" (PDF). Manager Magazin (in German).
- Huldermann, Bernhard (1922). Albert Ballin. translated by Wilhelm Johann Eggers. London: Cassell. OCLC 305940.
- Kludas, Arnold; Bischoff, Herbert (1979). Die Schiffe der Hamburg-Amerika Linie (in German). Vol. 1, 1847–1906. Herford: Koehler. ISBN 978-3-7822-0221-3.
- Journal ASNE (1896). "Merchant Steamers". Journal of the American Society of Naval Engineers. 8 (1). American Society of Naval Engineers.
- Louden-Brown, Paul. "The Alexandra Graving Dock - A Link with Liners Past: Part Two". Titanic Belfast.
- Ramsay, David (2002) [2001]. Lusitania: Saga and Myth. New York: Norton. ISBN 978-0-393-05099-8.
- Straub, Eberhard (2001). Albert Ballin: Der Reeder des Kaisers (in German). Berlin: Siedler. ISBN 978-3-88680-677-5.
- Weth, H (1891). Die Orient-Reise der "Augusta Victoria" vom Januar bis März 1891. Nach den Berichten in den Feuilletons des "Hamburger Fremdenblatt" und des "Berliner Börsen-Courier" (in German). Hamburg: Diedrich. OCLC 21556024.
