= SS Normannia (1890) =

German ocean liner (1890–1906)

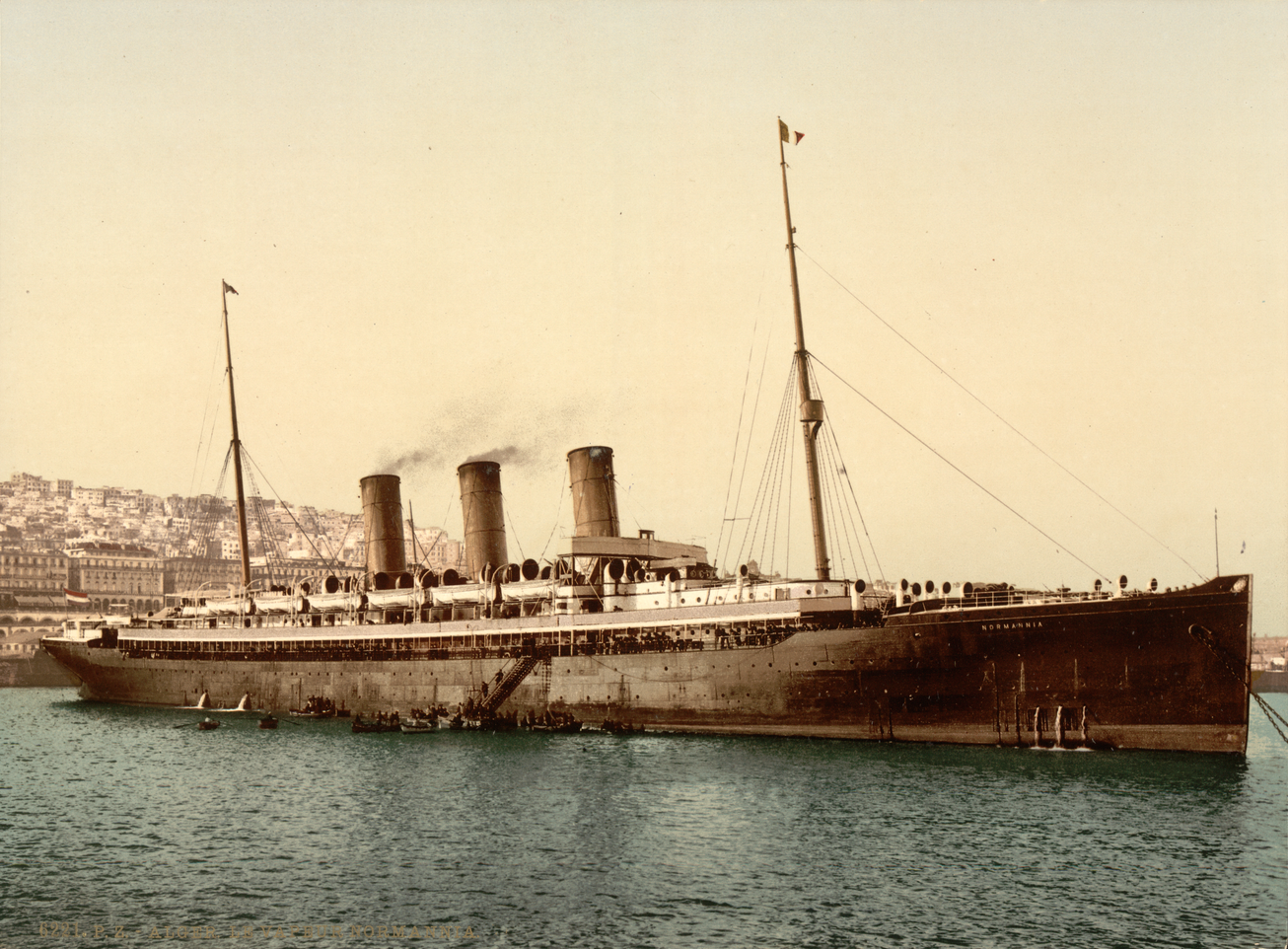
- Normannia, docked in Algiers, c. 1899

History
- Name: Normannia (1890–1898); Patriota (1898–1899); L'Aquitaine (1898–1906)
- Owner: Hamburg America Line (1890–1898); Spanish Navy (1898–1899); Compagnie Générale Transatlantique (1899–1906)
- Builder: Fairfield Shipbuilding and Engineering Limited
- Yard number: 343
- Launched: 9 February 1890
- In service: 1890
- Out of service: 1906
- Fate: Scrapped 1906

General characteristics
- Tonnage: 8,242 GRT
- Length: 500 ft (150 m)
- Beam: 57.5 ft (17.5 m)
- Draught: 38 ft (12 m)
- Installed power: 14,000 ihp (10,000 kW)
- Propulsion: Two, three-cylinder triple expansion engines
- Speed: 19 knots (35 km/h; 22 mph) (design service speed)
- Capacity: 1,298 passengers total: 428 first class; 170 second class; 700 third class

SS Normannia was a German ocean liner owned by the Hamburg America Line and built by Fairfield Shipbuilding and Engineering Company of Govan, Scotland. She was launched on 9 February 1890.

== Career ==
=== Hamburg America Line ===
Normannia was the largest and most powerful vessel built by that yard at the time, and was the third in a quartet of similar vessels built to form Hamburg America Line's new weekly express service operating from Hamburg to New York via Southampton. A year earlier AG Vulcan in Stettin had built the first of the class, the slightly smaller Augusta Victoria; while Laird Brother's at Birkenhead in the UK had built the second: Columbia. The last ship of quartet to be constructed was Fürst Bismarck, also built in Stettin and launched towards the end of 1890.

The construction of the Normannia was supervised by a contingent of German representatives of the Hamburg American Line including marine superintendent Captain Meyer and superintendent engineer Mr. E. Ritschard. She had twin screws driven by two triple-expansion engines located in two separate engine-rooms, each set having three cylinders. Her electrical installation was by Siemans and comprised four dynamos and 1100 Edison-Swan lamps.

The design and construction of her interior was carried out by the Bembe Furniture Factory, of Mainz, Germany. As was typical of German liners of the period, her interior was lavish and gaudy, with her leading features being heavy gilt mouldings and wall and ceiling frescoes by eminent German artists.

On her official speed trials in the Firth of Clyde, she averaged just under 21 knots (39 km/h; 24 mph), and on her maiden trip from Southampton to New York her average speed was 19.25 knots (35.65 km/h; 22.15 mph). Her guaranteed speed was 19 knots (35 km/h; 22 mph).

In January 1894, Normannia was hit and badly damaged by a freak wave en route from New York to Algiers. The wave was reported as being "mast high". Several deck houses were damaged, along with part of her promenade deck, and parts of steerage area were flooded with six feet of water. Seven men and the second officer were badly injured.

=== Later career ===
In 1898, she was purchased by the Spanish Navy for use in the Spanish–American War, and renamed Patriota. In service, her length was increased to 521 ft (159 m). She was fitted with four 5.5-inch guns which were also armored with 3.5-inch thick gun shields. However, she did not see much service during the war. She was acquired in the following year by the French shipping company Compagnie Générale Transatlantique and was returned to commercial service under the name of L'Aquitaine, where she remained until she was scrapped in September 1906.
