= SS Normannia =

A number of steamships have been named Normannia, including:

- SS Normannia (1890), in service 1890–1906
- SS Normannia (1911), in service 1912–1940
- SS Normannia (1952), in service 1952–1978.
