= SS Fürst Bismarck (1890) =

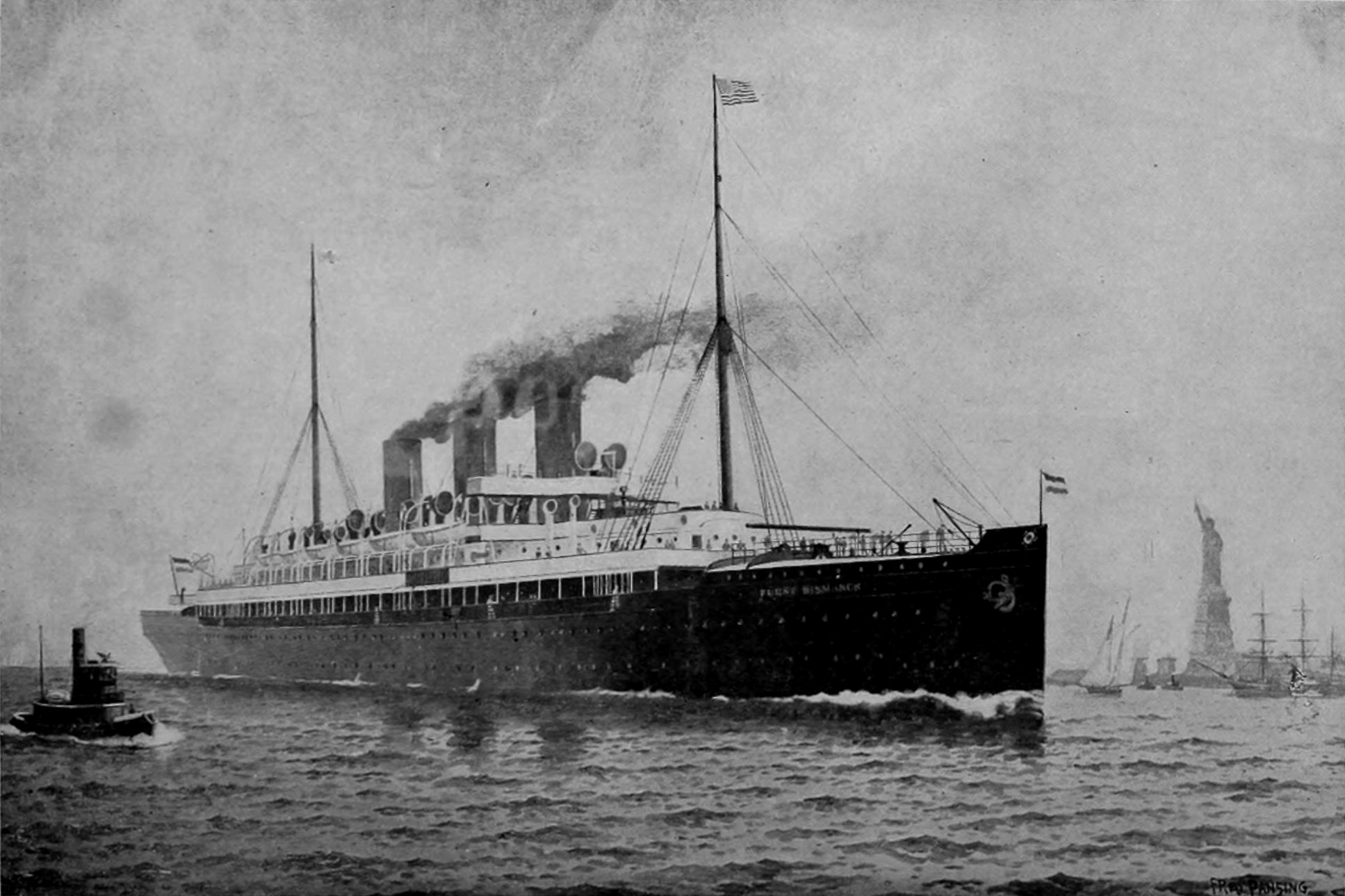
- SS Fürst Bismarck

History

German Empire
- Name: Fürst Bismarck
- Owner: Hamburg America Line
- Builder: AG Vulcan
- Launched: 29 November 1890
- Maiden voyage: 8 May 1891
- Fate: Sold to Russia, 1904

Russian Empire
- Name: Don
- In service: 1904
- Renamed: 1906, Moskva
- Fate: Sold to Austria

Austria-Hungary
- Name: Gäa
- In service: 1913
- Fate: Seized by Italy

Italy
- Name: San Giusto
- In service: c. 1917
- Fate: Scrapped, 1924

General characteristics
- Type: Ocean liner
- Tonnage: 8,430 GRT
- Length: 502.6 ft
- Beam: 57½ ft
- Depth: 38 ft
- Propulsion: Triple expansion steam, twin screw

The first SS Fürst Bismarck was an ocean liner built in 1890 by AG Vulcan for the Hamburg America Line. A steamship of 8,430 gross register tons, it was assigned to transatlantic crossings between Hamburg Germany and New York City, United States. Fürst Bismarck and the sister ships were part of an express fleet that usually made the trip in five to six days.

== HAPAG's express fleet ==
The fleet of twin-screw express steamships operated between New York to Plymouth, Cherbourg and Hamburg, and from Hamburg, Southampton, and Cherbourg to New York. The fleet consisted of the SS Augusta Victoria and the SS Fürst Bismarck, built by the Vulcan Shipbuilding Company at Stettin, the SS Columbia, built by Laird Brothers, in Birkenhead, near Liverpool, and the SS Normannia, built by the Fairfield Shipbuilding and Engineering Company, in Glasgow. With these vessels the company maintained a weekly transatlantic express service, offering the public the convenience of safe and comfortable travel between America and the European Continent.

== Design ==
The SS Fürst Bismarck was designed with five decks constructed of steel and teak. The three funnels rose above the hurricane deck. The ship also had two masts, but without yards. Each side of the ship was subdivided into numerous watertight compartments. The hull of the ship had a double bottom, the space between divided into chambers, which could be filled with water or emptied by means of automatic pumps, thus increasing or decreasing the draught at will, and guarding the ship from grounding. The enormous engines [were] of 6000 to 8000 horsepower each. The screws are of manganese bronze, with three or four blades.

First class deck state rooms, located mid-ship, were 7 to 9 feet in width, with elaborate furnishings. Separate saloons for men and women allowed for privacy, smoking (gentlemen only), and conversation. The Second class rooms were on the same level as first class, but with most rooms located fore and aft, with smaller rooms and their own saloons. The steerage was directly below the Second Cabin; separate compartments housed single men, women, and families.

== Dimensions ==
The ship was 502.6 feet long, and 57.6 feet in breadth, and measured 8,430 gross register tons.

== Machinery ==
The vessel's machinery was duplicated, with two distinct sets of boilers, engines, shafts and screws, both sets working independently of each other. A longitudinal bulkhead divided the vessel into two non-communicating halves, each of which was fully equipped to propel the ship. Contemporary advertising promoted this design as safer than a single boiler compartment because of its numerous watertight compartments, and the ability of the ship to propel itself even if one side was disabled.

== Service ==
Launched on November 29, 1890, the ship made its maiden run from Hamburg to New York, via Southampton (England), on May 8, 1891. Pyotr Ilyich Tchaikovsky sailed from New York on the liner's return trip, following his one trip to the United States. In the service of Hamburg America line (HAPAG) on September 27, 1894, 5 days, 18 hours, 10 minutes, with Captain Adolph Albers (1843–1902) at the helm. Albers, later Commodore of the Hamburg America fleet, held several speed records for trans Atlantic crossings before his death at the helm of the SS Deutschland in 1902. Between its maiden journey and 1894, the ship made 14 crossings, predominantly as an immigrant ship, and carrying American travelers to Europe on the return journey. On July 4, 1894, in honor of its many crossings and "in memory of Muhlenberg, Herkimer, Steuben and Dekalb," the Daughters of the American Revolution and the Columbia Liberty Bell Company presented the ship, and its Captain, with a replica of the Liberty Bell, requesting that the ship's captain ordered it to be rung when the ship came in sight of the Navesink Highlands (by day) or Navesink Twin Lights (by night). After 1894, it was occasionally in use as a luxury cruise ship. HAPAG commissioned a second SS Fürst Bismarck (1905) in 1905.

In 1904, the ship became the auxiliary cruiser the Don in the Russian Navy. In 1906, she was assigned to the Russian Volunteer Fleet with the name Moskva. In 1913, she became a torpedo boat depot ship in the Austrian-Hungarian Navy, the "Gäa." In 1918, due to the crew adapting social democratic ideas, started a mutiny while she was docked off Cattaro. The vessel was seized by Italy at the end of the First World War, rebuilt, and renamed San Guisto. She was scrapped in Italy in 1924.
