= Christian Wilhelm Allers =

German painter and illustrator (1857–1915)

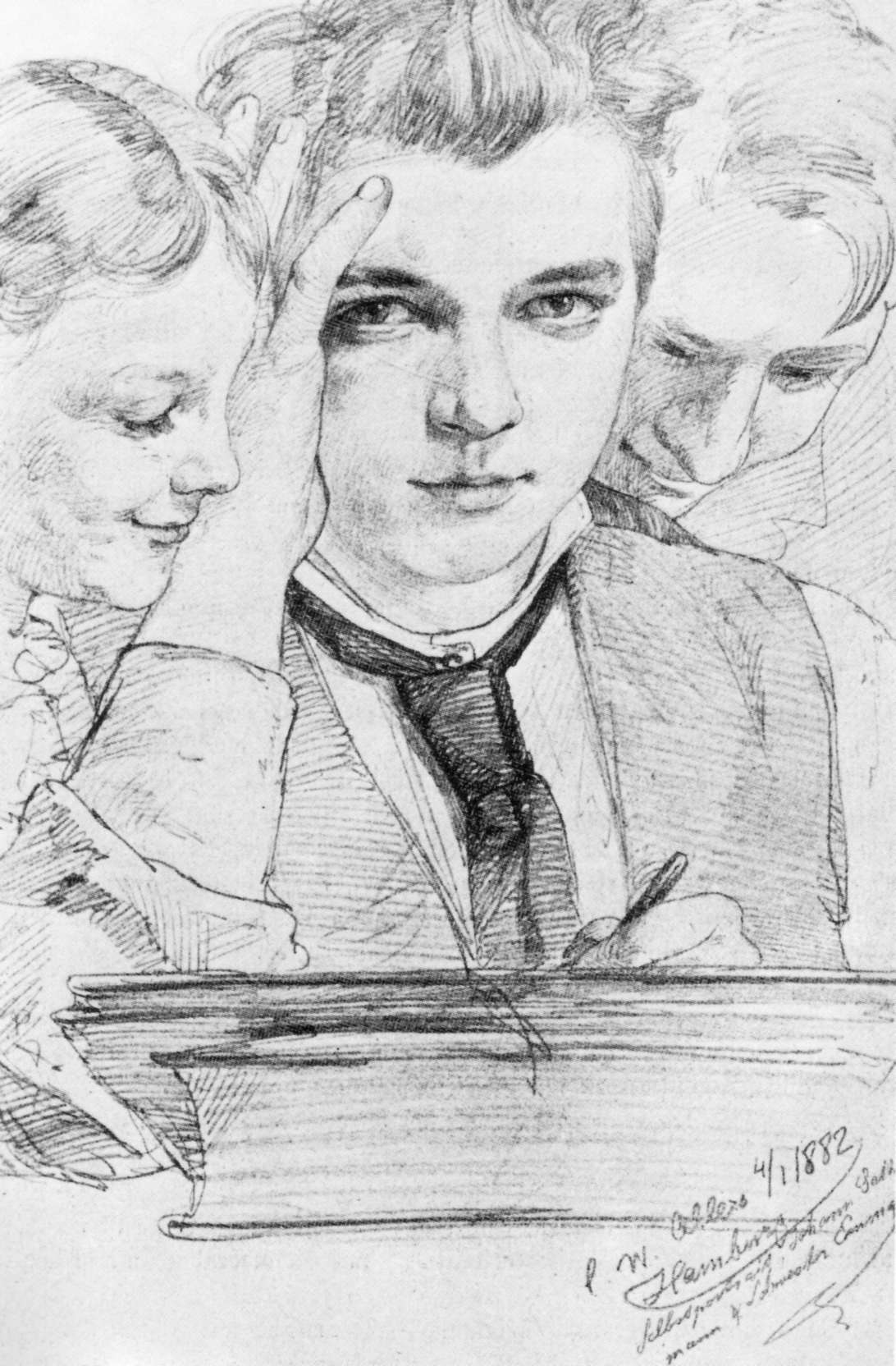
- Self portrait, 1882
- Born: 6 August 1857; Hamburg, Germany
- Died: 19 October 1915 (aged 58)
- Occupations: painter and printmaker
- Known for: his collection of prints "Club Eintracht"

Christian Wilhelm Allers (6 August 1857 – 19 October 1915) was a German painter and printmaker.

== Biography ==
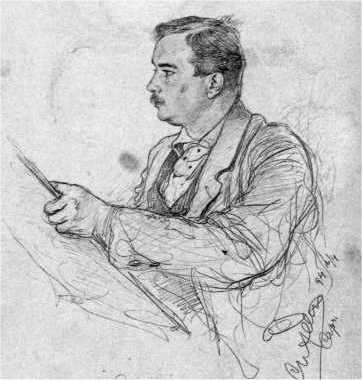
Self portrait, 1894

Allers, the son of a merchant, was born in Hamburg. He first worked as a lithographer, and in 1877 he moved to Karlsruhe where he continued to work as a lithographer. In the Kunstakademie (state academy of fine arts) he was a scholar of Prof. Ferdinand Keller.

From 1880–81 he served in the German navy in Kiel where Anton Alexander von Werner supported him. In Kiel he got to know Klaus Groth, who became a friend of his.

Allers became well known when he published his collection of prints "Club Eintracht" in 1888. Several other books and maps (collections of prints) followed, by way of example Bismarck, so at the beginning of the 1890s he was able to build a villa on Capri. He lived there for many years, also spending some time in Hamburg, Karlsruhe, and travelling around the world.

In autumn 1902, there was a scandal. Friedrich Alfred Krupp, another famous person living in Capri, was accused by some Italian newspapers of homosexuality and pederasty. Some weeks later, Allers was accused, by court. Krupp died some weeks later, presumably a suicide. Allers managed to escape before the lawsuit began, which led to a sentence of 4½ years imprisonment, pronounced in absentia. According to Tito Fiorani, "Allers had distinctly homosexual tendencies, and liked to surround himself with boys, whom he often used as models".

Allers left Capri and began travelling around the world for more than 10 years, staying some time in New Zealand, Samoa, and Australia. During this time, he often used the pseudonym "W. Andresen", and earned money by making portraits of wealthy people. He died in 1915 in Karlsruhe some months after returning to Germany.

== Arts ==
Allers was a naturalist. His drawings are rich in detail and are of realistic style, so they often lack emotions. Although the drawings look realistic, Allers sometimes added persons to scenes who were never at that location. In this respect, he was not a realist. Technically, Allers often used pencil. To start with, his colored drawings were usually in pencil and were colored later (pastel, oil, ...). His subjects were:

- Everyday life scenes (e.g. Club Eintracht, Spreeathener, Hochzeitsreise)
- Travel reports (e.g. La Bella Napoli, Rund um die Welt, Unter deutscher Flagge)
- Portraits

== Books and collections of prints ==
1. 1885 Aus Kamerun. Ein Bilderbuch für kleine und große Kinder.
2. 1887 Hinter den Coulissen des Circus Renz
3. 1887 Hamburger Bilder
4. 1887 The Mikado
5. 1888 Club Eintracht - Eine Sommerfahrt
6. 1889 Eine Hochzeitsreise durch die Schweiz
7. 1889 Spreeathener. Berliner Bilder
8. 1890 Die Meininger
9. 1890 Die silberne Hochzeit
10. 1891 Unsere Marine
11. 1891 Backschisch
12. 1892 Capri
13. 1892 Fürst Bismarck in Friedrichsruh
14. 1893 La bella Napoli
15. 1895 Unser Bismarck
16. 1896 Hochzeitsreise nach Italien
17. 1898 Das deutsche Jägerbuch
18. 1898 Rund um die Erde
19. 1898 Unser Bismarck. Gedächtnis-Ausgabe
20. 1900 Unter deutscher Flagge
21. 1902 Das deutsche Corpsleben

== Some drawings and paintings ==
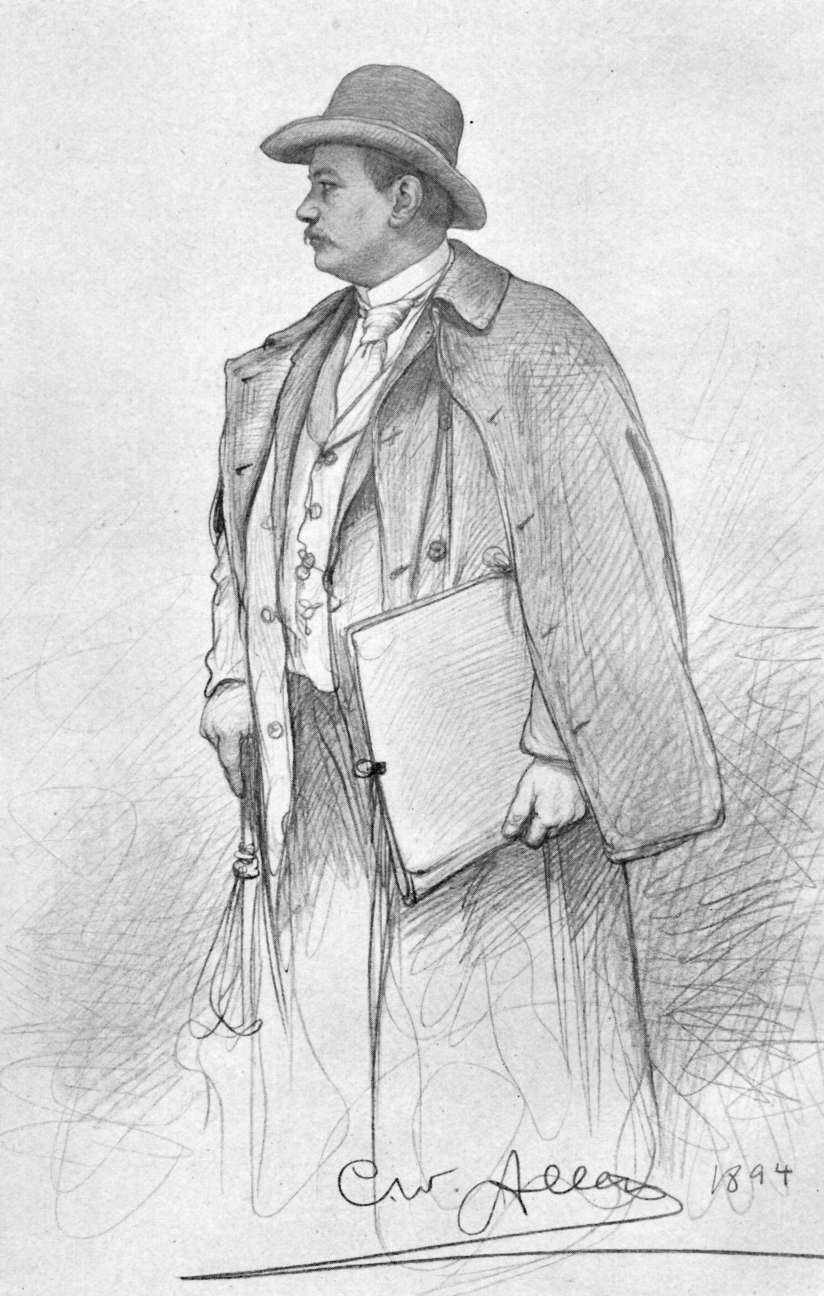
Self portrait (1894)

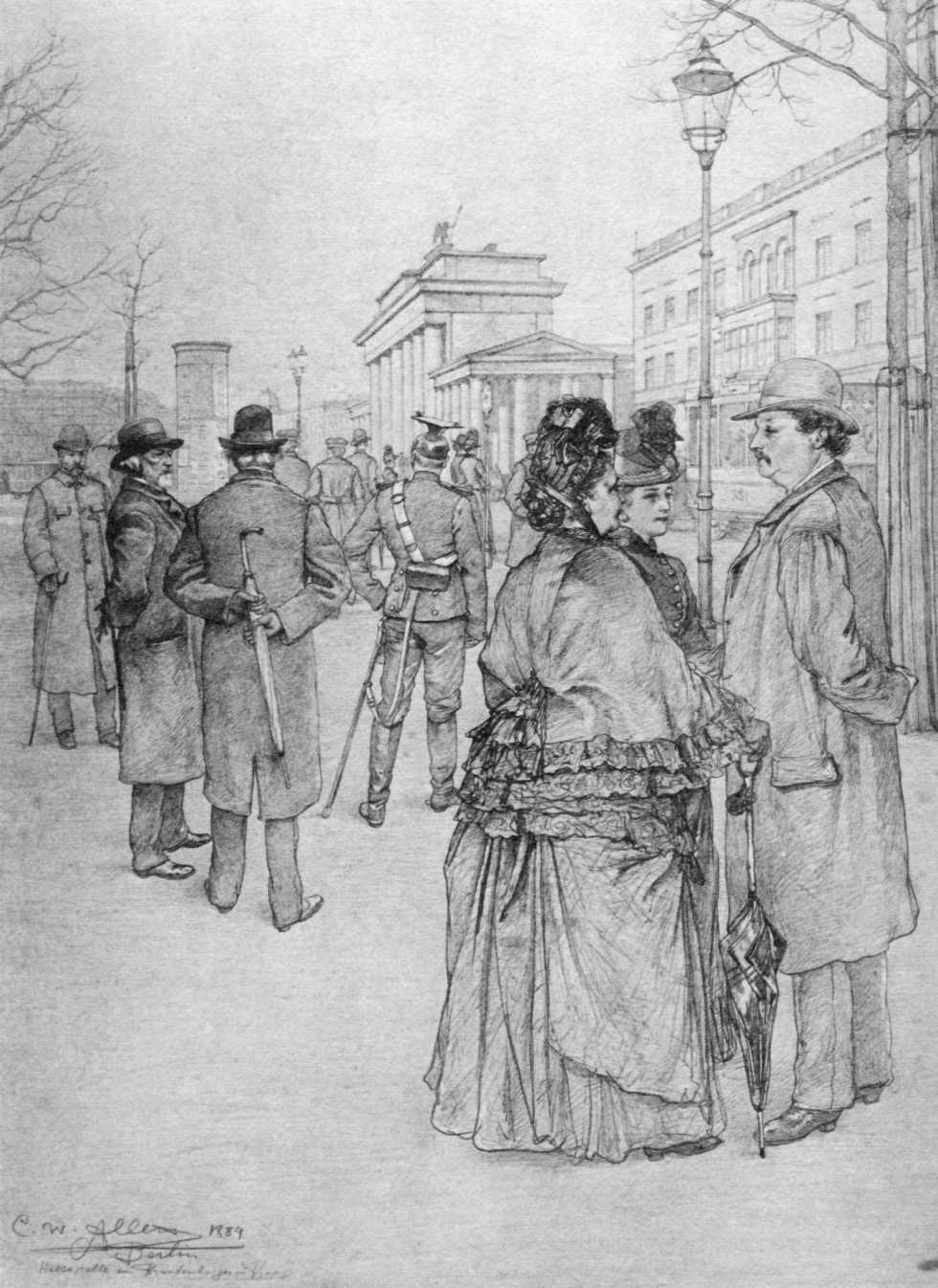
Berlin (near the Brandenburg Gate, 1889)

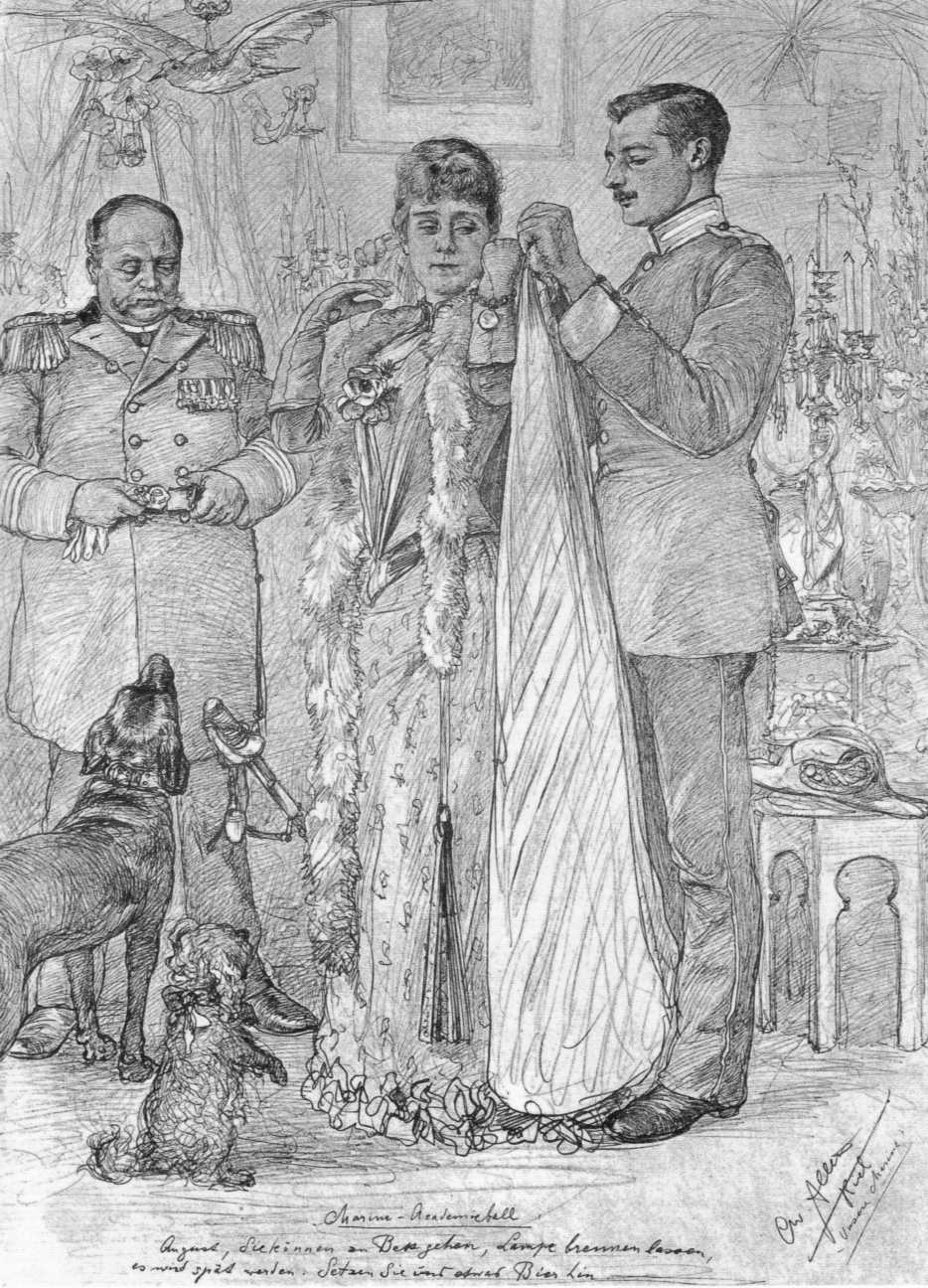
Preparing for a navy academy festival

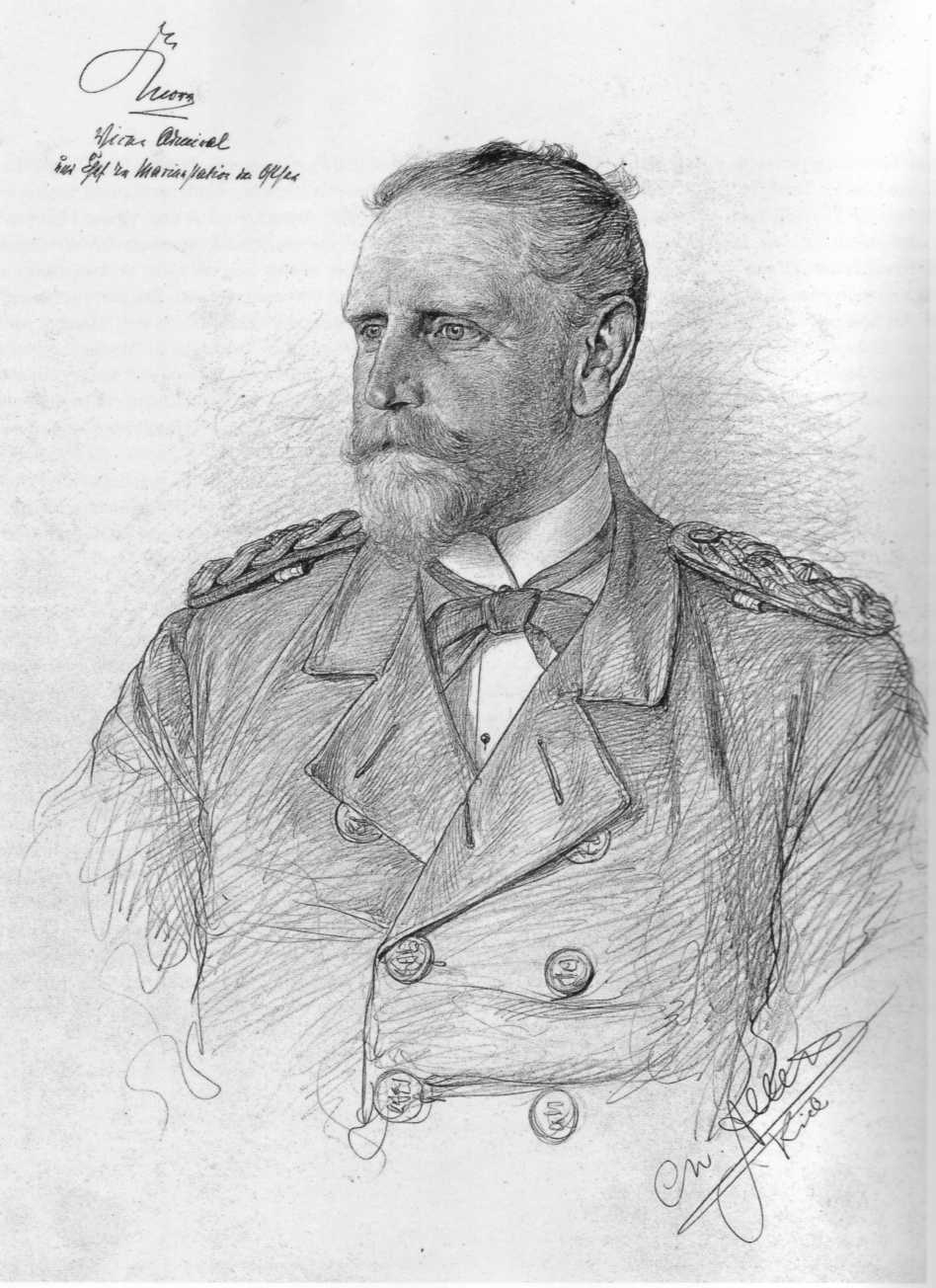
Vice admiral Eduard von Knorr

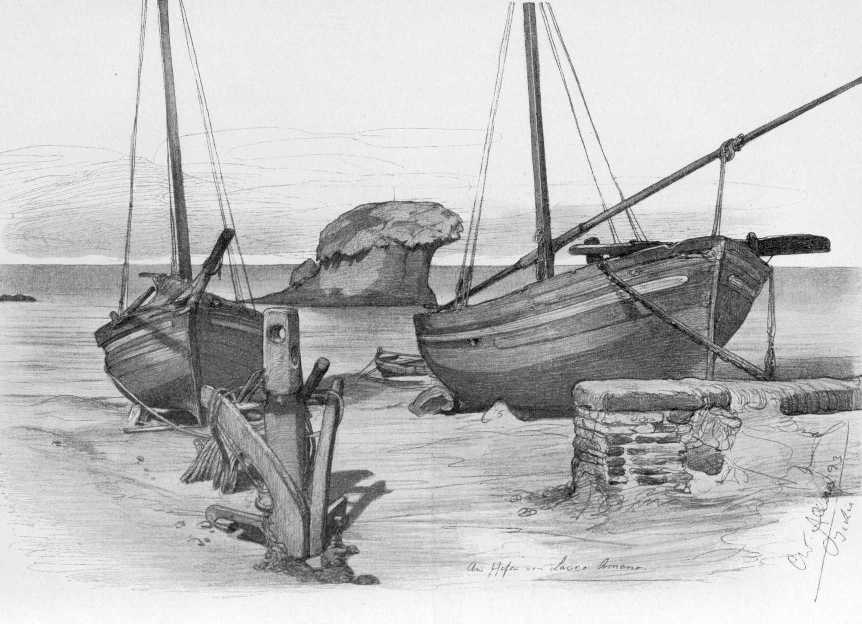
Harbour of Lacco Ameno (Ischia, Italy)

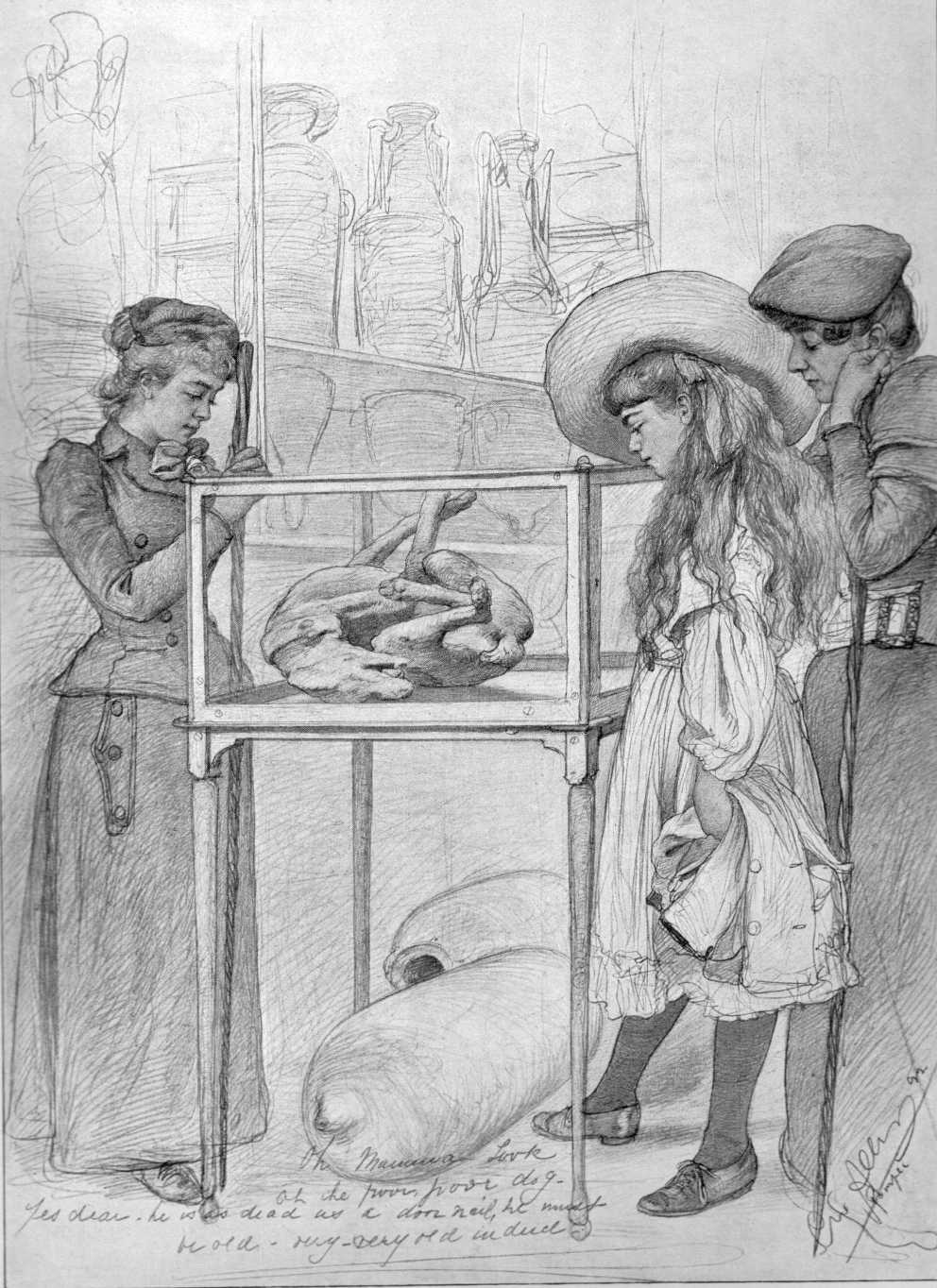
Pompei: 'Oh the poor poor dog'

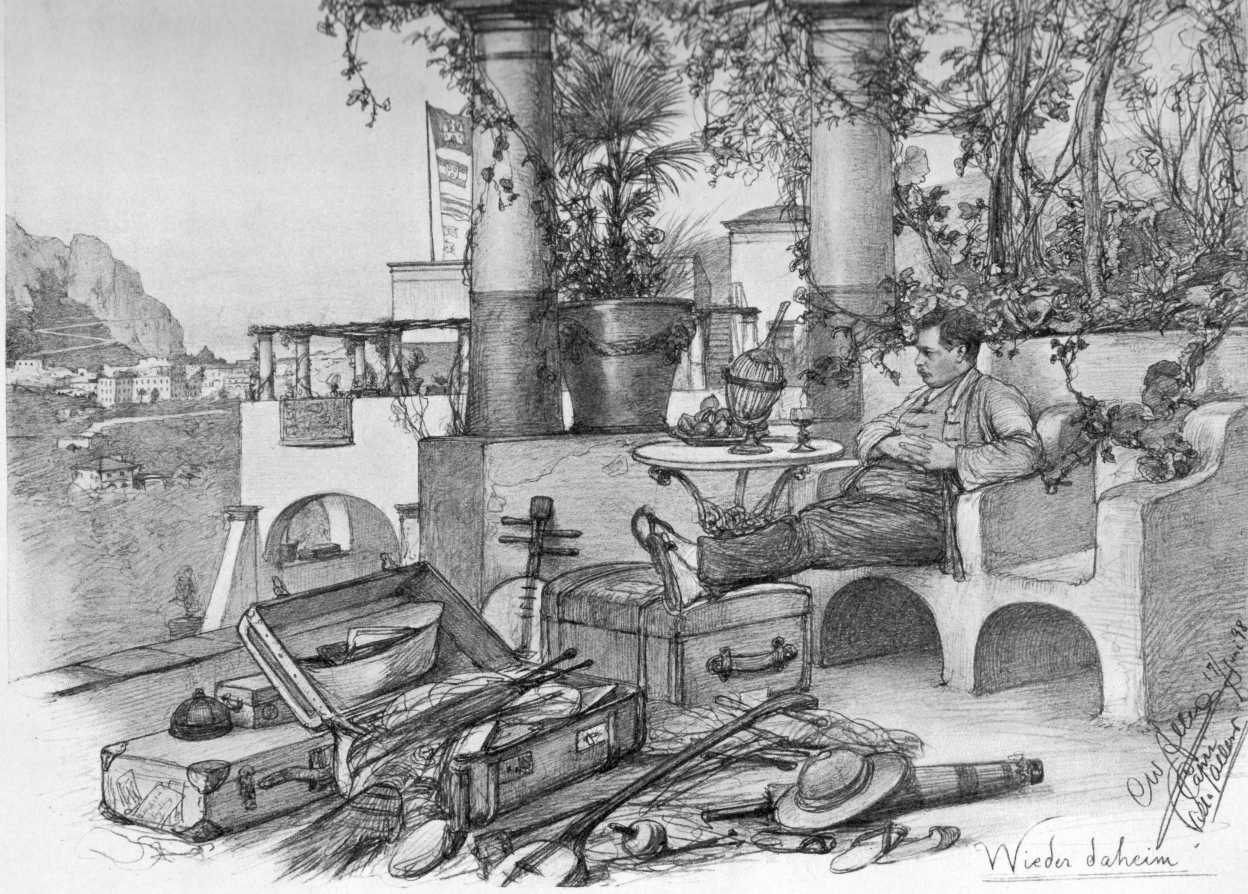
Capri, Villa Allers

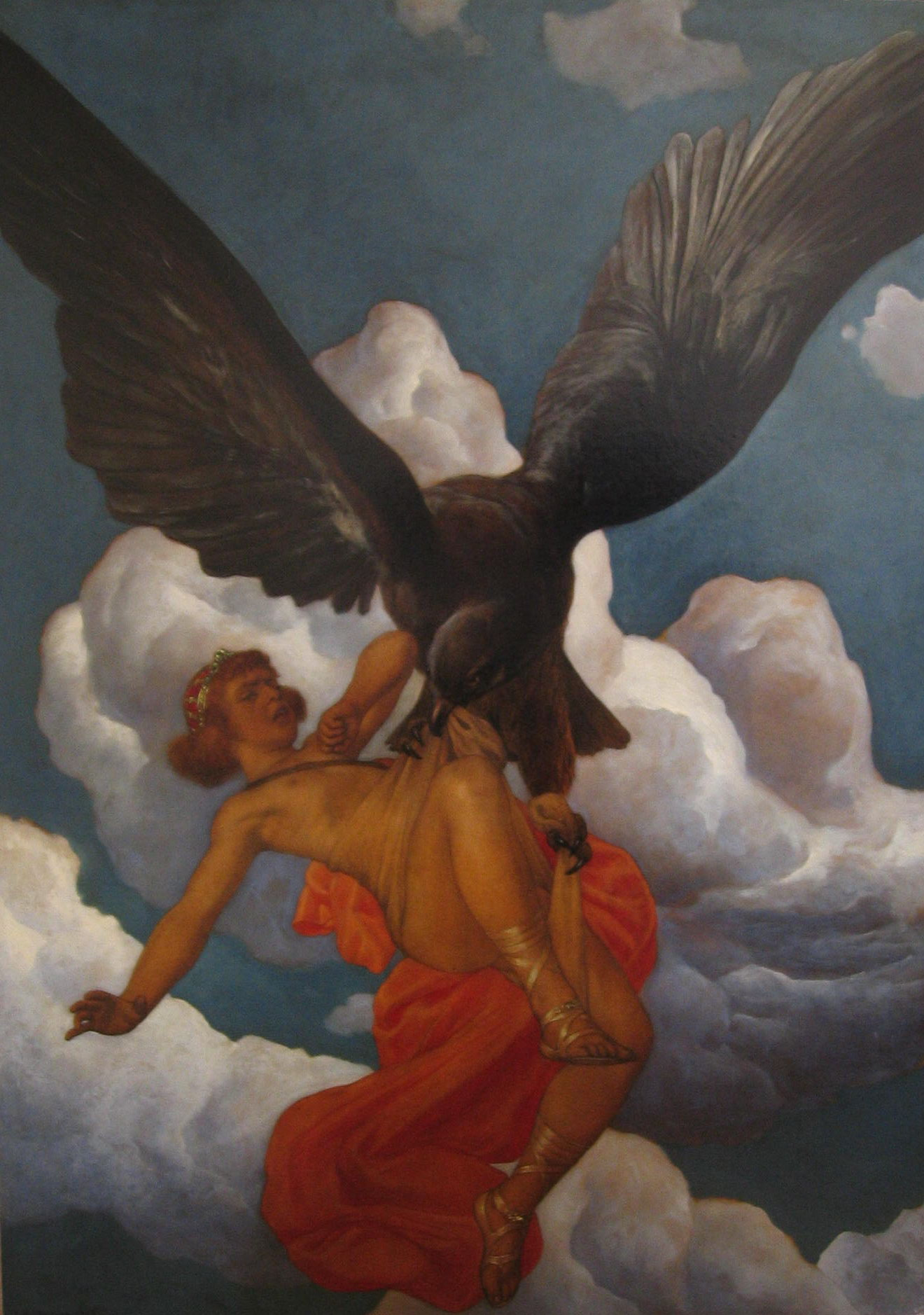
Ganymede (1913, signed as 'W.Andresen')

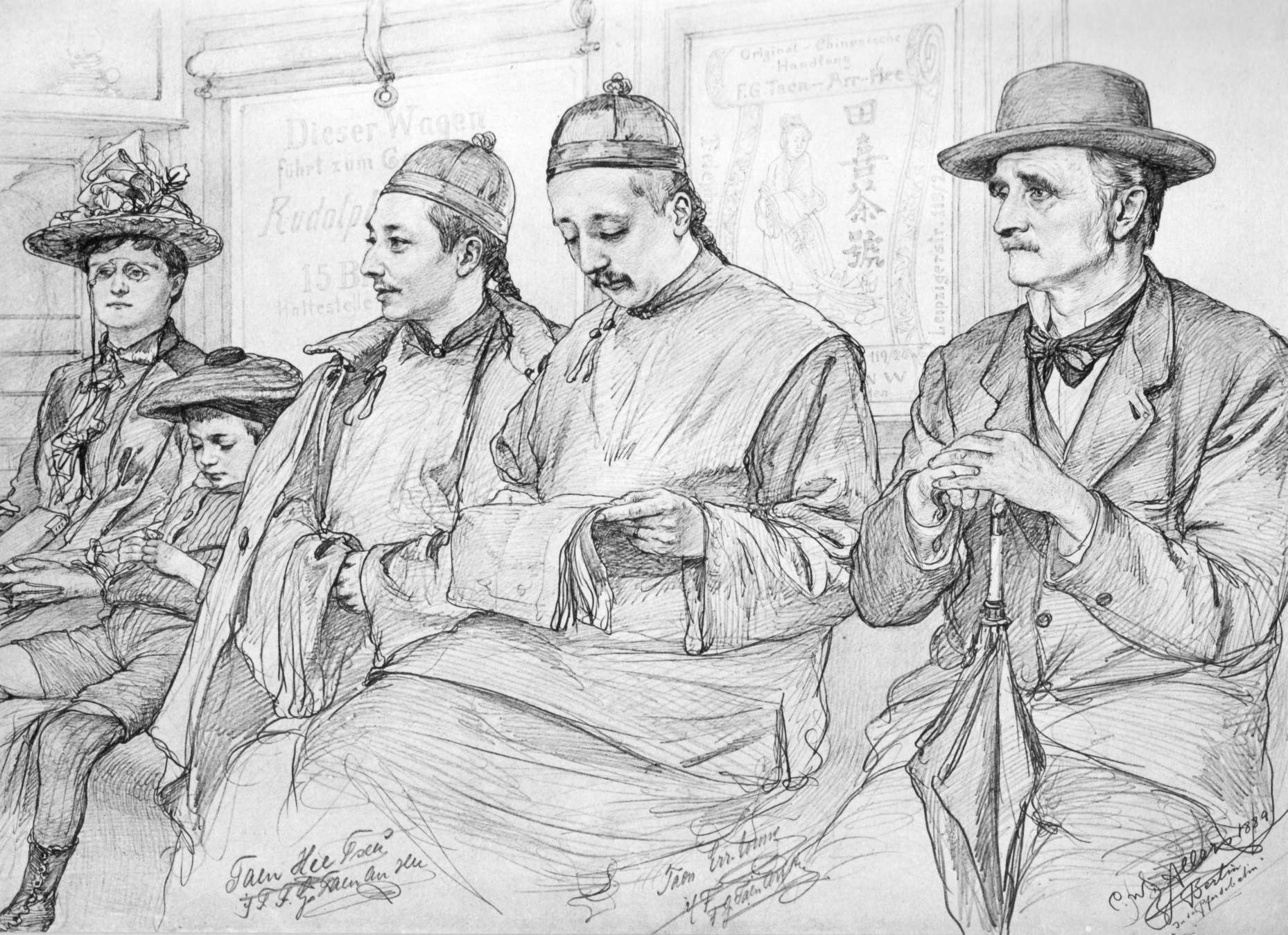
Allers Spree 28 China in Berlin

== See also ==
- List of German painters
